= List of MeSH codes (C14) =

The following is a partial list of the "C" codes for Medical Subject Headings (MeSH), as defined by the United States National Library of Medicine (NLM).

This list continues the information at List of MeSH codes (C13). Codes following these are found at List of MeSH codes (C15). For other MeSH codes, see List of MeSH codes.

The source for this content is the set of 2006 MeSH Trees from the NLM.

== MeSH C14 – cardiovascular diseases ==
=== MeSH C14.240 – cardiovascular abnormalities ===
==== MeSH C14.240.150 – arteriovenous malformations ====
- MeSH C14.240.150.125 – arteriovenous fistula
- MeSH C14.240.150.295 – intracranial arteriovenous malformations

==== MeSH C14.240.400 – heart defects, congenital ====
- MeSH C14.240.400.044 – alagille syndrome
- MeSH C14.240.400.090 – aortic coarctation
- MeSH C14.240.400.145 – arrhythmogenic right ventricular dysplasia
- MeSH C14.240.400.200 – cor triatriatum
- MeSH C14.240.400.210 – coronary vessel anomalies
- MeSH C14.240.400.220 – crisscross heart
- MeSH C14.240.400.280 – dextrocardia
- MeSH C14.240.400.280.500 – kartagener syndrome
- MeSH C14.240.400.340 – ductus arteriosus, patent
- MeSH C14.240.400.395 – Ebstein's anomaly
- MeSH C14.240.400.450 – Eisenmenger complex
- MeSH C14.240.400.560 – heart septal defects
- MeSH C14.240.400.560.098 – aortopulmonary septal defect
- MeSH C14.240.400.560.350 – endocardial cushion defects
- MeSH C14.240.400.560.375 – heart septal defects, atrial
- MeSH C14.240.400.560.375.518 – Lutembacher's syndrome
- MeSH C14.240.400.560.375.702 – trilogy of Fallot
- MeSH C14.240.400.560.540 – heart septal defects, ventricular
- MeSH C14.240.400.625 – hypoplastic left heart syndrome
- MeSH C14.240.400.695 – leopard syndrome
- MeSH C14.240.400.701 – levocardia
- MeSH C14.240.400.725 – Marfan syndrome
- MeSH C14.240.400.849 – tetralogy of Fallot
- MeSH C14.240.400.915 – transposition of great vessels
- MeSH C14.240.400.915.300 – double outlet right ventricle
- MeSH C14.240.400.920 – tricuspid atresia
- MeSH C14.240.400.929 – truncus arteriosus, persistent

=== MeSH C14.280 – heart diseases ===
==== MeSH C14.280.067 – arrhythmia ====
- MeSH C14.280.067.093 – arrhythmia, sinus
- MeSH C14.280.067.198 – atrial fibrillation
- MeSH C14.280.067.248 – atrial flutter
- MeSH C14.280.067.319 – bradycardia
- MeSH C14.280.067.325 – cardiac complexes, premature
- MeSH C14.280.067.325.250 – atrial premature complexes
- MeSH C14.280.067.325.500 – ventricular premature complexes
- MeSH C14.280.067.558 – heart block
- MeSH C14.280.067.558.137 – Adams–Stokes syndrome
- MeSH C14.280.067.558.323 – bundle-branch block
- MeSH C14.280.067.558.750 – sinoatrial block
- MeSH C14.280.067.565 – long QT syndrome
- MeSH C14.280.067.565.070 – Andersen syndrome
- MeSH C14.280.067.565.440 – Jervell and Lange-Nielsen syndrome
- MeSH C14.280.067.565.720 – Romano–Ward syndrome
- MeSH C14.280.067.672 – parasystole
- MeSH C14.280.067.780 – pre-excitation syndromes
- MeSH C14.280.067.780.560 – Lown–Ganong–Levine syndrome
- MeSH C14.280.067.780.770 – pre-excitation, mahaim-type
- MeSH C14.280.067.780.977 – Wolff–Parkinson–White syndrome
- MeSH C14.280.067.829 – sick sinus syndrome
- MeSH C14.280.067.845 – tachycardia
- MeSH C14.280.067.845.695 – tachycardia, paroxysmal
- MeSH C14.280.067.845.880 – tachycardia, supraventricular
- MeSH C14.280.067.845.880.025 – accelerated idioventricular rhythm
- MeSH C14.280.067.845.880.095 – tachycardia, atrioventricular nodal reentry
- MeSH C14.280.067.845.880.315 – tachycardia, ectopic atrial
- MeSH C14.280.067.845.880.320 – tachycardia, ectopic junctional
- MeSH C14.280.067.845.880.840 – tachycardia, sinoatrial nodal reentry
- MeSH C14.280.067.845.880.845 – tachycardia, sinus
- MeSH C14.280.067.845.940 – tachycardia, ventricular
- MeSH C14.280.067.845.940.350 – arrhythmogenic right ventricular dysplasia
- MeSH C14.280.067.845.940.700 – torsades de pointes
- MeSH C14.280.067.932 – ventricular fibrillation

==== MeSH C14.280.195 – cardiomegaly ====
- MeSH C14.280.195.160 – cardiomyopathy, dilated
- MeSH C14.280.195.400 – hypertrophy, left ventricular
- MeSH C14.280.195.410 – hypertrophy, right ventricular

==== MeSH C14.280.238 – cardiomyopathies ====
- MeSH C14.280.238.057 – cardiomyopathy, alcoholic
- MeSH C14.280.238.070 – cardiomyopathy, dilated
- MeSH C14.280.238.100 – cardiomyopathy, hypertrophic
- MeSH C14.280.238.100.500 – cardiomyopathy, hypertrophic, familial
- MeSH C14.280.238.160 – cardiomyopathy, restrictive
- MeSH C14.280.238.190 – chagas cardiomyopathy
- MeSH C14.280.238.281 – endocardial fibroelastosis
- MeSH C14.280.238.406 – endomyocardial fibrosis
- MeSH C14.280.238.458 – glycogen storage disease type iib
- MeSH C14.280.238.510 – Kearns–Sayre syndrome
- MeSH C14.280.238.615 – myocardial reperfusion injury
- MeSH C14.280.238.625 – myocarditis

==== MeSH C14.280.282 – endocarditis ====
- MeSH C14.280.282.407 – endocarditis, bacterial
- MeSH C14.280.282.407.407 – endocarditis, subacute bacterial

==== MeSH C14.280.383 – heart arrest ====
- MeSH C14.280.383.220 – death, sudden, cardiac

==== MeSH C14.280.400 – heart defects, congenital ====
- MeSH C14.280.400.090 – aortic coarctation
- MeSH C14.280.400.145 – arrhythmogenic right ventricular dysplasia
- MeSH C14.280.400.200 – cor triatriatum
- MeSH C14.280.400.210 – coronary vessel anomalies
- MeSH C14.280.400.220 – crisscross heart
- MeSH C14.280.400.280 – dextrocardia
- MeSH C14.280.400.280.500 – Kartagener syndrome
- MeSH C14.280.400.340 – ductus arteriosus, patent
- MeSH C14.280.400.395 – Ebstein's anomaly
- MeSH C14.280.400.450 – Eisenmenger complex
- MeSH C14.280.400.560 – heart septal defects
- MeSH C14.280.400.560.098 – aortopulmonary septal defect
- MeSH C14.280.400.560.350 – endocardial cushion defects
- MeSH C14.280.400.560.375 – heart septal defects, atrial
- MeSH C14.280.400.560.375.518 – Lutembacher's syndrome
- MeSH C14.280.400.560.375.702 – trilogy of Fallot
- MeSH C14.280.400.560.540 – heart septal defects, ventricular
- MeSH C14.280.400.625 – hypoplastic left heart syndrome
- MeSH C14.280.400.695 – leopard syndrome
- MeSH C14.280.400.701 – levocardia
- MeSH C14.280.400.725 – Marfan syndrome
- MeSH C14.280.400.849 – tetralogy of Fallot
- MeSH C14.280.400.915 – transposition of great vessels
- MeSH C14.280.400.915.300 – double outlet right ventricle
- MeSH C14.280.400.920 – tricuspid atresia
- MeSH C14.280.400.929 – truncus arteriosus, persistent

==== MeSH C14.280.434 – heart failure, congestive ====
- MeSH C14.280.434.160 – cardiomyopathy, dilated
- MeSH C14.280.434.313 – dyspnea, paroxysmal
- MeSH C14.280.434.482 – edema, cardiac

==== MeSH C14.280.470 – heart rupture ====
- MeSH C14.280.470.475 – heart rupture, post-infarction
- MeSH C14.280.470.475.900 – ventricular septal rupture

==== MeSH C14.280.484 – heart valve diseases ====
- MeSH C14.280.484.095 – aortic valve insufficiency
- MeSH C14.280.484.150 – aortic valve stenosis
- MeSH C14.280.484.150.060 – aortic stenosis, supravalvular
- MeSH C14.280.484.150.060.960 – williams syndrome
- MeSH C14.280.484.150.070 – aortic stenosis, subvalvular
- MeSH C14.280.484.150.070.160 – cardiomyopathy, hypertrophic
- MeSH C14.280.484.150.070.210 – discrete subaortic stenosis
- MeSH C14.280.484.275 – heart murmurs
- MeSH C14.280.484.400 – heart valve prolapse
- MeSH C14.280.484.400.100 – aortic valve prolapse
- MeSH C14.280.484.400.500 – mitral valve prolapse
- MeSH C14.280.484.400.875 – tricuspid valve prolapse
- MeSH C14.280.484.461 – mitral valve insufficiency
- MeSH C14.280.484.517 – mitral valve stenosis
- MeSH C14.280.484.640 – pulmonary atresia
- MeSH C14.280.484.660 – pulmonary valve insufficiency
- MeSH C14.280.484.716 – pulmonary valve stenosis
- MeSH C14.280.484.716.525 – leopard syndrome
- MeSH C14.280.484.716.700 – pulmonary subvalvular stenosis
- MeSH C14.280.484.845 – tricuspid atresia
- MeSH C14.280.484.856 – tricuspid valve insufficiency
- MeSH C14.280.484.911 – tricuspid valve stenosis

==== MeSH C14.280.647 – myocardial ischemia ====
- MeSH C14.280.647.250 – coronary disease
- MeSH C14.280.647.250.125 – angina pectoris
- MeSH C14.280.647.250.125.150 – angina, unstable
- MeSH C14.280.647.250.125.150.150 – angina pectoris, variant
- MeSH C14.280.647.250.125.575 – microvascular angina
- MeSH C14.280.647.250.250 – coronary aneurysm
- MeSH C14.280.647.250.260 – Coronary Arteriosclerosis
- MeSH C14.280.647.250.285 – coronary stenosis
- MeSH C14.280.647.250.285.200 – coronary restenosis
- MeSH C14.280.647.250.290 – coronary thrombosis
- MeSH C14.280.647.250.295 – coronary vasospasm
- MeSH C14.280.647.250.295.130 – angina pectoris, variant
- MeSH C14.280.647.500 – myocardial infarction
- MeSH C14.280.647.500.375 – myocardial stunning
- MeSH C14.280.647.500.750 – shock, cardiogenic
- MeSH C14.280.647.750 – myocardial stunning

==== MeSH C14.280.720 – pericarditis ====
- MeSH C14.280.720.595 – pericarditis, constrictive
- MeSH C14.280.720.801 – pericarditis, tuberculous

==== MeSH C14.280.945 – ventricular dysfunction ====
- MeSH C14.280.945.900 – ventricular dysfunction, left
- MeSH C14.280.945.910 – ventricular dysfunction, right

=== MeSH C14.907 – vascular diseases ===
==== MeSH C14.907.055 – aneurysm ====
- MeSH C14.907.055.050 – aneurysm, dissecting
- MeSH C14.907.055.050.150 – carotid artery, internal, dissection
- MeSH C14.907.055.050.575 – vertebral artery dissection
- MeSH C14.907.055.090 – aneurysm, false
- MeSH C14.907.055.131 – aneurysm, infected
- MeSH C14.907.055.185 – aneurysm, ruptured
- MeSH C14.907.055.185.125 – aortic rupture
- MeSH C14.907.055.239 – aortic aneurysm
- MeSH C14.907.055.239.075 – aortic aneurysm, abdominal
- MeSH C14.907.055.239.125 – aortic aneurysm, thoracic
- MeSH C14.907.055.239.175 – aortic rupture
- MeSH C14.907.055.395 – coronary aneurysm
- MeSH C14.907.055.608 – heart aneurysm
- MeSH C14.907.055.625 – iliac aneurysm
- MeSH C14.907.055.635 – intracranial aneurysm

==== MeSH C14.907.075 – angiodysplasia ====
- MeSH C14.907.075.280 – gastric antral vascular ectasia

==== MeSH C14.907.077 – angiomatosis ====
- MeSH C14.907.077.060 – angiomatosis, bacillary
- MeSH C14.907.077.350 – Von Hippel–Lindau disease
- MeSH C14.907.077.410 – Klippel–Trénaunay syndrome
- MeSH C14.907.077.850 – Sturge–Weber syndrome

==== MeSH C14.907.109 – aortic diseases ====
- MeSH C14.907.109.139 – aortic aneurysm
- MeSH C14.907.109.139.075 – aortic aneurysm, abdominal
- MeSH C14.907.109.139.125 – aortic aneurysm, thoracic
- MeSH C14.907.109.139.175 – aortic rupture
- MeSH C14.907.109.239 – aortic arch syndromes
- MeSH C14.907.109.239.650 – takayasu's arteritis
- MeSH C14.907.109.320 – aortitis
- MeSH C14.907.109.661 – leriche's syndrome

==== MeSH C14.907.137 – arterial occlusive diseases ====
- MeSH C14.907.137.126 – arteriosclerosis
- MeSH C14.907.137.126.056 – arteriolosclerosis
- MeSH C14.907.137.126.114 – arteriosclerosis obliterans
- MeSH C14.907.137.126.307 – atherosclerosis
- MeSH C14.907.137.126.372 – intracranial arteriosclerosis
- MeSH C14.907.137.126.372.500 – dementia, vascular
- MeSH C14.907.137.126.393 – Coronary arteriosclerosis
- MeSH C14.907.137.126.669 – intermittent claudication
- MeSH C14.907.137.126.834 – Monckeberg medial calcific sclerosis
- MeSH C14.907.137.230 – carotid stenosis
- MeSH C14.907.137.372 – fibromuscular dysplasia
- MeSH C14.907.137.427 – Leriche's syndrome
- MeSH C14.907.137.534 – mesenteric vascular occlusion
- MeSH C14.907.137.615 – moyamoya disease
- MeSH C14.907.137.727 – renal artery obstruction
- MeSH C14.907.137.780 – retinal artery occlusion
- MeSH C14.907.137.870 – thromboangiitis obliterans

==== MeSH C14.907.150 – arteriovenous malformations ====
- MeSH C14.907.150.125 – arteriovenous fistula
- MeSH C14.907.150.295 – intracranial arteriovenous malformations

==== MeSH C14.907.184 – arteritis ====
- MeSH C14.907.184.140 – aids arteritis, central nervous system
- MeSH C14.907.184.281 – endarteritis
- MeSH C14.907.184.595 – polyarteritis nodosa
- MeSH C14.907.184.800 – takayasu's arteritis
- MeSH C14.907.184.823 – temporal arteritis

==== MeSH C14.907.253 – cerebrovascular disorders ====
- MeSH C14.907.253.061 – basal ganglia cerebrovascular disease
- MeSH C14.907.253.061.200 – basal ganglia hemorrhage
- MeSH C14.907.253.061.200.500 – putaminal hemorrhage
- MeSH C14.907.253.123 – carotid artery diseases
- MeSH C14.907.253.123.331 – carotid artery thrombosis
- MeSH C14.907.253.123.345 – carotid artery injuries
- MeSH C14.907.253.123.345.300 – carotid artery, internal, dissection
- MeSH C14.907.253.123.345.400 – carotid-cavernous sinus fistula
- MeSH C14.907.253.123.353 – carotid artery, internal, dissection
- MeSH C14.907.253.123.360 – carotid stenosis
- MeSH C14.907.253.123.490 – carotid-cavernous sinus fistula
- MeSH C14.907.253.123.620 – moyamoya disease
- MeSH C14.907.253.295 – intracranial arteriovenous malformations
- MeSH C14.907.253.337 – cerebral arterial diseases
- MeSH C14.907.253.337.187 – cadasil
- MeSH C14.907.253.337.375 – infarction, anterior cerebral artery
- MeSH C14.907.253.337.562 – infarction, middle cerebral artery
- MeSH C14.907.253.337.656 – infarction, posterior cerebral artery
- MeSH C14.907.253.337.750 – moyamoya disease
- MeSH C14.907.253.378 – intracranial embolism and thrombosis
- MeSH C14.907.253.378.206 – carotid artery thrombosis
- MeSH C14.907.253.378.300 – intracranial embolism
- MeSH C14.907.253.378.350 – intracranial thrombosis
- MeSH C14.907.253.378.586 – sinus thrombosis, intracranial
- MeSH C14.907.253.378.586.375 – cavernous sinus thrombosis
- MeSH C14.907.253.378.586.562 – lateral sinus thrombosis
- MeSH C14.907.253.378.586.750 – sagittal sinus thrombosis
- MeSH C14.907.253.420 – cerebral hemorrhage
- MeSH C14.907.253.420.150 – basal ganglia hemorrhage
- MeSH C14.907.253.420.150.500 – putaminal hemorrhage
- MeSH C14.907.253.420.200 – cerebral hemorrhage, traumatic
- MeSH C14.907.253.459 – brain ischemia
- MeSH C14.907.253.480 – cerebrovascular accident
- MeSH C14.907.253.480.200 – brain infarction
- MeSH C14.907.253.480.200.100 – brain stem infarctions
- MeSH C14.907.253.480.200.100.500 – lateral medullary syndrome
- MeSH C14.907.253.480.200.200 – cerebral infarction
- MeSH C14.907.253.480.200.200.400 – infarction, anterior cerebral artery
- MeSH C14.907.253.480.200.200.450 – infarction, middle cerebral artery
- MeSH C14.907.253.480.200.200.475 – infarction, posterior cerebral artery
- MeSH C14.907.253.535 – cerebrovascular trauma
- MeSH C14.907.253.535.500 – carotid artery injuries
- MeSH C14.907.253.535.500.300 – carotid artery, internal, dissection
- MeSH C14.907.253.535.500.350 – carotid-cavernous sinus fistula
- MeSH C14.907.253.535.600 – subarachnoid hemorrhage, traumatic
- MeSH C14.907.253.535.800 – vertebral artery dissection
- MeSH C14.907.253.545 – hypoxia-ischemia, brain
- MeSH C14.907.253.545.200 – brain ischemia
- MeSH C14.907.253.545.200.400 – ischemic attack, transient
- MeSH C14.907.253.545.400 – hypoxia, brain
- MeSH C14.907.253.560 – intracranial arterial diseases
- MeSH C14.907.253.560.200 – cerebral arterial diseases
- MeSH C14.907.253.560.200.175 – cadasil
- MeSH C14.907.253.560.200.200 – cerebral amyloid angiopathy
- MeSH C14.907.253.560.200.200.160 – cerebral amyloid angiopathy, familial
- MeSH C14.907.253.560.200.325 – infarction, anterior cerebral artery
- MeSH C14.907.253.560.200.387 – infarction, middle cerebral artery
- MeSH C14.907.253.560.200.418 – infarction, posterior cerebral artery
- MeSH C14.907.253.560.200.450 – intracranial aneurysm
- MeSH C14.907.253.560.200.475 – intracranial arteriosclerosis
- MeSH C14.907.253.560.200.475.500 – dementia, vascular
- MeSH C14.907.253.560.400 – intracranial arteriovenous malformations
- MeSH C14.907.253.573 – intracranial hemorrhages
- MeSH C14.907.253.573.200 – cerebral hemorrhage
- MeSH C14.907.253.573.200.150 – basal ganglia hemorrhage
- MeSH C14.907.253.573.200.150.500 – putaminal hemorrhage
- MeSH C14.907.253.573.200.200 – cerebral hemorrhage, traumatic
- MeSH C14.907.253.573.350 – intracranial hemorrhage, hypertensive
- MeSH C14.907.253.573.400 – intracranial hemorrhage, traumatic
- MeSH C14.907.253.573.400.150 – brain hemorrhage, traumatic
- MeSH C14.907.253.573.400.150.200 – brain stem hemorrhage, traumatic
- MeSH C14.907.253.573.400.150.300 – cerebral hemorrhage, traumatic
- MeSH C14.907.253.573.400.400 – hematoma, epidural, cranial
- MeSH C14.907.253.573.400.450 – hematoma, subdural
- MeSH C14.907.253.573.400.450.050 – hematoma, subdural, acute
- MeSH C14.907.253.573.400.450.120 – hematoma, subdural, chronic
- MeSH C14.907.253.573.400.450.400 – hematoma, subdural, intracranial
- MeSH C14.907.253.573.400.700 – subarachnoid hemorrhage, traumatic
- MeSH C14.907.253.573.600 – pituitary apoplexy
- MeSH C14.907.253.573.800 – subarachnoid hemorrhage
- MeSH C14.907.253.573.800.700 – subarachnoid hemorrhage, traumatic
- MeSH C14.907.253.612 – leukomalacia, periventricular
- MeSH C14.907.253.774 – sneddon syndrome
- MeSH C14.907.253.937 – vascular headaches
- MeSH C14.907.253.946 – vasculitis, central nervous system
- MeSH C14.907.253.946.175 – aids arteritis, central nervous system
- MeSH C14.907.253.946.350 – lupus vasculitis, central nervous system
- MeSH C14.907.253.946.700 – temporal arteritis
- MeSH C14.907.253.951 – vasospasm, intracranial
- MeSH C14.907.253.953 – vertebral artery dissection
- MeSH C14.907.253.956 – vertebrobasilar insufficiency
- MeSH C14.907.253.956.700 – subclavian steal syndrome

==== MeSH C14.907.320 – diabetic angiopathies ====
- MeSH C14.907.320.191 – diabetic foot
- MeSH C14.907.320.382 – diabetic retinopathy

==== MeSH C14.907.355 – embolism and thrombosis ====
- MeSH C14.907.355.350 – embolism
- MeSH C14.907.355.350.254 – embolism, air
- MeSH C14.907.355.350.354 – embolism, amniotic fluid
- MeSH C14.907.355.350.404 – embolism, cholesterol
- MeSH C14.907.355.350.404.200 – blue toe syndrome
- MeSH C14.907.355.350.454 – embolism, fat
- MeSH C14.907.355.350.700 – pulmonary embolism
- MeSH C14.907.355.350.850 – thromboembolism
- MeSH C14.907.355.350.850.213 – intracranial embolism and thrombosis
- MeSH C14.907.355.350.850.213.206 – carotid artery thrombosis
- MeSH C14.907.355.350.850.213.300 – intracranial embolism
- MeSH C14.907.355.350.850.213.350 – intracranial thrombosis
- MeSH C14.907.355.350.850.213.669 – sinus thrombosis, intracranial
- MeSH C14.907.355.350.850.213.669.375 – cavernous sinus thrombosis
- MeSH C14.907.355.350.850.213.669.562 – lateral sinus thrombosis
- MeSH C14.907.355.350.850.213.669.750 – sagittal sinus thrombosis
- MeSH C14.907.355.350.850.400 – embolism, paradoxical
- MeSH C14.907.355.830 – thrombosis
- MeSH C14.907.355.830.220 – coronary thrombosis
- MeSH C14.907.355.830.600 – purpura, thrombotic thrombocytopenic
- MeSH C14.907.355.830.850 – thromboembolism
- MeSH C14.907.355.830.850.213 – intracranial embolism and thrombosis
- MeSH C14.907.355.830.850.213.206 – carotid artery thrombosis
- MeSH C14.907.355.830.850.213.300 – intracranial embolism
- MeSH C14.907.355.830.850.213.350 – intracranial thrombosis
- MeSH C14.907.355.830.850.213.669 – sinus thrombosis, intracranial
- MeSH C14.907.355.830.850.213.669.375 – cavernous sinus thrombosis
- MeSH C14.907.355.830.850.213.669.562 – lateral sinus thrombosis
- MeSH C14.907.355.830.850.213.669.750 – sagittal sinus thrombosis
- MeSH C14.907.355.830.850.400 – embolism, paradoxical
- MeSH C14.907.355.830.925 – venous thrombosis
- MeSH C14.907.355.830.925.275 – hepatic vein thrombosis
- MeSH C14.907.355.830.925.650 – retinal vein occlusion
- MeSH C14.907.355.830.925.770 – thrombophlebitis

==== MeSH C14.907.489 – hypertension ====
- MeSH C14.907.489.330 – hypertension, malignant
- MeSH C14.907.489.480 – hypertension, pregnancy-induced
- MeSH C14.907.489.631 – hypertension, renal
- MeSH C14.907.489.631.485 – hypertension, renovascular

==== MeSH C14.907.514 – hypotension ====
- MeSH C14.907.514.482 – hypotension, orthostatic
- MeSH C14.907.514.482.853 – Shy–Drager syndrome

==== MeSH C14.907.553 – ischemia ====
- MeSH C14.907.553.120 – brain ischemia
- MeSH C14.907.553.180 – colitis, ischemic
- MeSH C14.907.553.241 – compartment syndromes
- MeSH C14.907.553.241.063 – anterior compartment syndrome
- MeSH C14.907.553.355 – infarction
- MeSH C14.907.553.355.249 – brain infarction
- MeSH C14.907.553.355.249.100 – brain stem infarctions
- MeSH C14.907.553.355.249.100.500 – lateral medullary syndrome
- MeSH C14.907.553.355.249.200 – cerebral infarction
- MeSH C14.907.553.355.249.200.199 – dementia, multi-infarct
- MeSH C14.907.553.355.249.200.400 – infarction, anterior cerebral artery
- MeSH C14.907.553.355.249.200.450 – infarction, middle cerebral artery
- MeSH C14.907.553.355.249.200.475 – infarction, posterior cerebral artery
- MeSH C14.907.553.355.500 – myocardial infarction
- MeSH C14.907.553.355.500.375 – myocardial stunning
- MeSH C14.907.553.355.500.750 – shock, cardiogenic
- MeSH C14.907.553.355.750 – pulmonary embolism
- MeSH C14.907.553.355.875 – splenic infarction
- MeSH C14.907.553.470 – myocardial ischemia
- MeSH C14.907.553.470.250 – coronary disease
- MeSH C14.907.553.470.250.125 – angina pectoris
- MeSH C14.907.553.470.250.125.130 – angina pectoris, variant
- MeSH C14.907.553.470.250.125.150 – angina, unstable
- MeSH C14.907.553.470.250.125.575 – microvascular angina
- MeSH C14.907.553.470.250.250 – coronary aneurysm
- MeSH C14.907.553.470.250.260 – Coronary Arteriosclerosis
- MeSH C14.907.553.470.250.285 – coronary stenosis
- MeSH C14.907.553.470.250.285.200 – coronary restenosis
- MeSH C14.907.553.470.250.290 – coronary thrombosis
- MeSH C14.907.553.470.250.295 – coronary vasospasm
- MeSH C14.907.553.470.250.295.130 – angina pectoris, variant
- MeSH C14.907.553.470.500 – myocardial infarction
- MeSH C14.907.553.470.500.375 – myocardial stunning
- MeSH C14.907.553.470.500.750 – shock, cardiogenic
- MeSH C14.907.553.470.750 – myocardial stunning
- MeSH C14.907.553.585 – optic neuropathy, ischemic
- MeSH C14.907.553.700 – reperfusion injury
- MeSH C14.907.553.700.600 – myocardial reperfusion injury
- MeSH C14.907.553.850 – spinal cord ischemia
- MeSH C14.907.553.850.100 – anterior spinal artery syndrome

==== MeSH C14.907.681 – phlebitis ====
- MeSH C14.907.681.760 – postphlebitic syndrome
- MeSH C14.907.681.788 – thrombophlebitis

==== MeSH C14.907.744 – Raynaud disease ====
- MeSH C14.907.744.500 – CREST syndrome

==== MeSH C14.907.790 – spinal cord vascular diseases ====
- MeSH C14.907.790.100 – anterior spinal artery syndrome
- MeSH C14.907.790.550 – spinal cord ischemia
- MeSH C14.907.790.550.100 – anterior spinal artery syndrome

==== MeSH C14.907.823 – telangiectasis ====
- MeSH C14.907.823.213 – ataxia telangiectasia
- MeSH C14.907.823.225 – CREST syndrome
- MeSH C14.907.823.780 – telangiectasia, hereditary hemorrhagic

==== MeSH C14.907.863 – thoracic outlet syndrome ====
- MeSH C14.907.863.200 – cervical rib syndrome

==== MeSH C14.907.927 – varicose veins ====
- MeSH C14.907.927.730 – varicose ulcer

==== MeSH C14.907.933 – vascular fistula ====
- MeSH C14.907.933.110 – arterio-arterial fistula
- MeSH C14.907.933.125 – arteriovenous fistula

==== MeSH C14.907.934 – vascular hemostatic disorders ====
- MeSH C14.907.934.140 – cryoglobulinemia
- MeSH C14.907.934.240 – Ehlers–Danlos syndrome
- MeSH C14.907.934.385 – hemangioma, cavernous
- MeSH C14.907.934.385.500 – hemangioma, cavernous, central nervous system
- MeSH C14.907.934.460 – multiple myeloma
- MeSH C14.907.934.530 – pseudoxanthoma elasticum
- MeSH C14.907.934.550 – purpura, hyperglobulinemic
- MeSH C14.907.934.580 – purpura, schoenlein-henoch
- MeSH C14.907.934.800 – scurvy
- MeSH C14.907.934.810 – Shwartzman phenomenon
- MeSH C14.907.934.900 – telangiectasia, hereditary hemorrhagic
- MeSH C14.907.934.960 – Waldenstrom macroglobulinemia

==== MeSH C14.907.940 – vasculitis ====
- MeSH C14.907.940.080 – aortitis
- MeSH C14.907.940.090 – arteritis
- MeSH C14.907.940.090.170 – aids arteritis, central nervous system
- MeSH C14.907.940.090.340 – endarteritis
- MeSH C14.907.940.090.720 – polyarteritis nodosa
- MeSH C14.907.940.090.800 – Takayasu's arteritis
- MeSH C14.907.940.090.905 – temporal arteritis
- MeSH C14.907.940.100 – Behcet syndrome
- MeSH C14.907.940.110 – Churg–Strauss syndrome
- MeSH C14.907.940.560 – mucocutaneous lymph node syndrome
- MeSH C14.907.940.740 – phlebitis
- MeSH C14.907.940.740.910 – thrombophlebitis
- MeSH C14.907.940.815 – retinal vasculitis
- MeSH C14.907.940.890 – Shwartzman phenomenon
- MeSH C14.907.940.905 – thromboangiitis obliterans
- MeSH C14.907.940.907 – vasculitis, central nervous system
- MeSH C14.907.940.907.175 – aids arteritis, central nervous system
- MeSH C14.907.940.907.350 – lupus vasculitis, central nervous system
- MeSH C14.907.940.907.700 – temporal arteritis
- MeSH C14.907.940.910 – vasculitis, hypersensitivity
- MeSH C14.907.940.910.600 – purpura, schoenlein-henoch
- MeSH C14.907.940.910.952 – vasculitis, allergic cutaneous
- MeSH C14.907.940.897.249.750 – granulomatosis with polyangiitis

==== MeSH C14.907.952 – venous insufficiency ====
- MeSH C14.907.952.760 – postphlebitic syndrome

The list continues at List of MeSH codes (C15).
