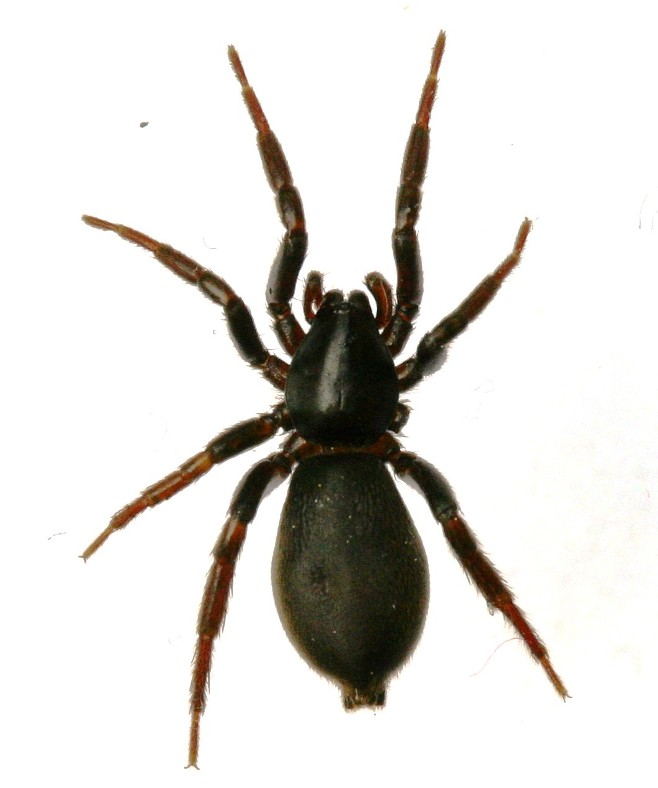

Scientific classification
- Kingdom: Animalia
- Phylum: Arthropoda
- Subphylum: Chelicerata
- Class: Arachnida
- Order: Araneae
- Infraorder: Araneomorphae
- Family: Gnaphosidae
- Genus: Zelotes
- Species: Z. subterraneus

Binomial name
- Zelotes subterraneus (C. L. Koch, 1833)

Synonyms
- Melanophora subterranea C. L. Koch, 1833; Filistata atra Wider, 1834; Melanophora violacea C. L. Koch, 1839; Drassus ater Blackwall, 1861; Prosthesima violacea (C. L. Koch, 1839); Prosthesima subterranea (C. L. Koch, 1833)

= Zelotes subterraneus =

Species of ground spider

Zelotes subterraneus is a species of ground spider from the family Gnaphosidae which has a Palearctic distribution. it is the type species of the genus Zelotes. Its distribution may be somewhat masked by the difficulty of distinguishing this species from Zelotes apricorum and Zelotes latreillei.

== Description ==
Zelotes subterraneus is one of a group shiny, all-black Zelotes species which are difficult to identify, the females being extremely similar and the males only being readily identifiable by reference to the tip of the embolus on the palps. The overall picture is additionally complicated by the apparent hybridisation between the two species in some areas, but this is disputed with some authorities claiming apparent hybrid characteristics may be the result of natural variation.

The length of the female's body is 5.8-9.2 mm, while the smaller male is 3.8-7.8 mm long.

== Habitat and ecology ==
Zelotes subterraneus has only been found in two types of habitat in Great Britain, under stones on mountains in the north of the island and in coastal habitats, mainly shingle, in the south-east. There is a strong possibility that, within Britain, Z. subterraneus has been misidentified as the more widespread Z. apricorum so Z. subterraneus may eventually be found to occur more widely. Elsewhere in Europe habitats utilised include woodland, heathland, dry meadows, boggy areas, under stones and bark and in the litter layer, up to 1300 m above sea level.

Adults of both sexes have been recorded in late spring/early summer and late summer/autumn. The white egg sac is attached to the underside of stones and guarded by the female. It is an active, nocturnal hunter, running down and catching a variety of terrestrial arthropods including other species of small spiders.

== Distribution ==
Zelotes subterraneus has a Palearctic distribution. In Europe it is frequently recorded in the north, and has been recorded from Belgium, the Netherlands, Denmark, Norway and Sweden. In Great Britain it is found in mountains of central and eastern Scotland and northern England and in coastal areas of the south east of England. It tends to be distributed to the north and east of Zelotes apicorum on the continent and this seems to be mirrored in their respective British distributions.
