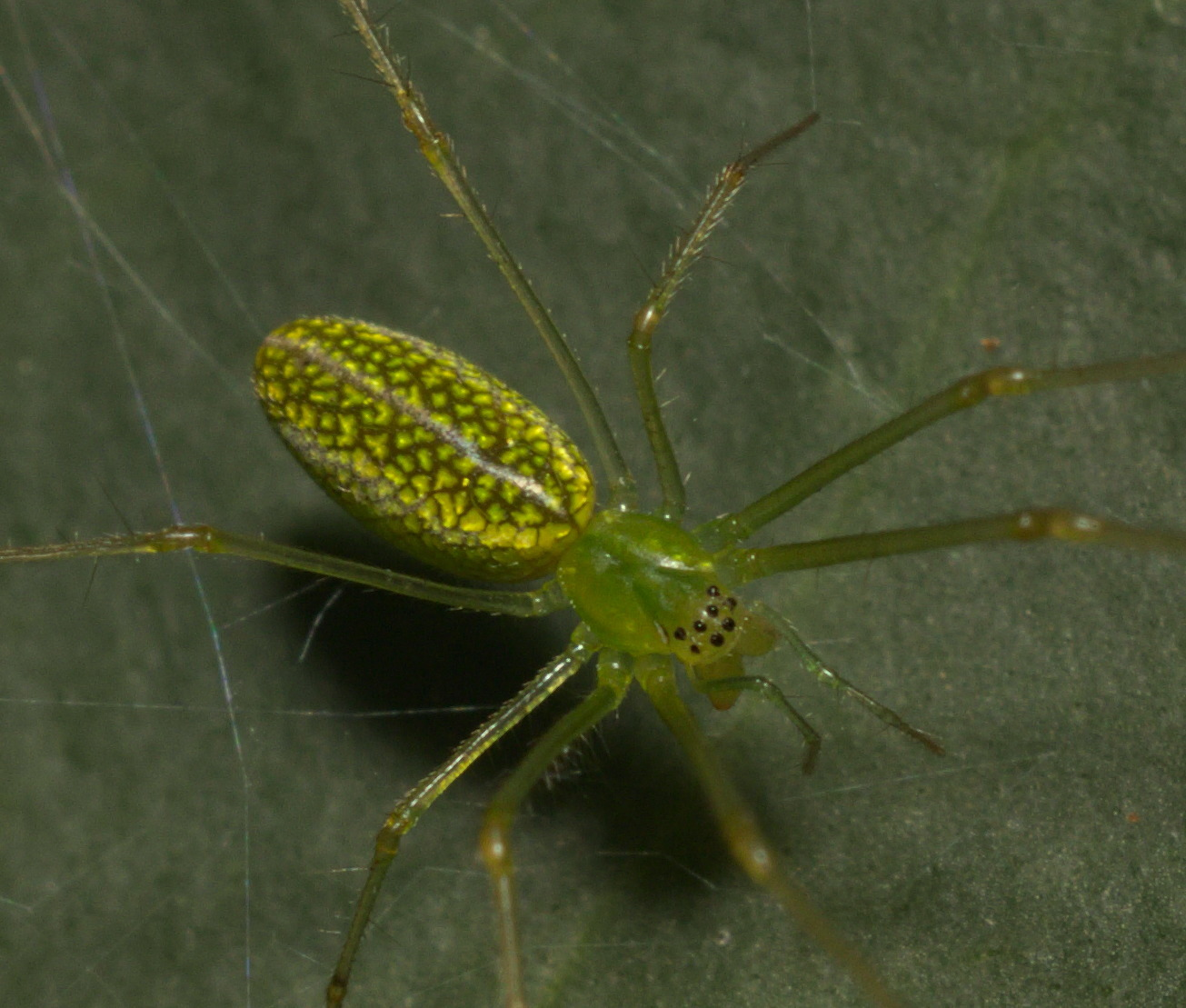
- T. yesoensis from Hong Kong

Scientific classification
- Kingdom: Animalia
- Phylum: Arthropoda
- Subphylum: Chelicerata
- Class: Arachnida
- Order: Araneae
- Infraorder: Araneomorphae
- Family: Tetragnathidae
- Genus: Tetragnatha
- Species: T. yesoensis

Binomial name
- Tetragnatha yesoensis Saito, 1934

= Tetragnatha yesoensis =

Species of spider

Tetragnatha yesoensis is a species of spider in the family Tetragnathidae (long-jawed orb weavers). It was first described by Saito in 1934 and is found across East Asia.

The species is named after Ezo, the historical name of Hokkaido, where the type specimen was collected.

== Distribution ==
T. yesoensis has a wide distribution across East Asia, having been recorded from Russia (Russian Far East), China, Korea, and Japan. In Korea, it has been found in mountainous regions including Mount Naejang and Mount Halla.

== Habitat ==
The species is typically found in mountainous regions, where it lives among bushes and shrubs in coppice areas. It constructs small orb webs that are oriented horizontally, which is characteristic of the genus Tetragnatha.

== Description ==
T. yesoensis shows typical sexual dimorphism found in many spider species, with females being larger than males.

Females have a body length of 7–10 mm. The carapace is longer than wide and yellowish brown in color, with distinct fovea and cervical and radial furrows. The chelicerae are yellowish brown and well-developed. The legs are yellowish brown with black spines and are characteristically slender and long, typical of the family Tetragnathidae. The abdomen is cylindrical in shape, longer than wide, and yellowish green dorsally with distinctive silver scale patterns. The female epigynum is broad and slightly bulged, with wide transverse copulatory openings.

Males are smaller, with a body length of 6–8 millimeters, and have similar coloration to females but generally darker. The male chelicerae are proportionally larger than those of females and bear a thick outer spur with a pointed tip. The male pedipalp has a paracymbium that is separated from the cymbium, a slender filiform embolus, and a conductor with three wrinkles.
