= Coronary vasospasm =

Partial or complete closing of a coronary artery

Coronary vasospasm refers to when a coronary artery suddenly undergoes either complete or sub-total temporary occlusion.

In 1959, Prinzmetal et al. described a type of chest pain resulting from coronary vasospasm, referring to it as a variant form of classical angina pectoris. Consequently, this angina has come to be reported and referred to in the literature as Prinzmetal angina. A subsequent study distinguished this type of angina from classical angina pectoris further by showing normal coronary arteries on cardiac catheterization. This finding is unlike the typical findings in classical angina pectoris, which usually shows atherosclerotic plaques on cardiac catheterization.

When coronary vasospasm occurs, the occlusion temporarily produces ischemia. A wide array of symptoms or presentations can follow: ranging from asymptomatic myocardial ischemia, sometimes referred to as silent ischemia, to myocardial infarction and even sudden cardiac death.

== Signs and symptoms ==
Coronary vasospasm classically produces chest pain at rest, also known as variant angina (vasospastic angina or Prinzmetal's angina). Chest pain is more common at certain times of the day, usually from late night to early morning. These episodes can be accompanied by nausea, vomiting, cold sweating, and even syncope. Coronary vasospasm is also associated with symptoms of fatigue and tiredness, dyspnea, and palpitations. These can sometimes be the primary presenting symptoms, but they can also occur in conjunction with chest pain.

There are cases of coronary vasospasm that occur without any symptoms at all, leading to episodes of silent or asymptomatic myocardial ischemia.

=== Complications ===
Depending on how long the occlusion lasts, a spectrum of different myocardial ischemic syndromes can occur. Shorter episodes of occlusion can lead to what is referred to as silent myocardial ischemia due to its asymptomatic nature. These episodes can also be accompanied by arrhythmias. Longer episodes of occlusion can lead to stable or unstable angina, myocardial infarction, and sudden cardiac death.

== Risk factors ==
Unlike classical angina pectoris, traditional cardiovascular risk factors are not thought to be significantly associated with coronary vasospasm. The exception to this is with smoking, which is known to be a modifiable risk factor for vasospastic angina.

There are several risk factors that are thought to precipitate, or trigger, episodes of coronary vasospasm. Many of these factors work by exerting effects on the autonomic nervous system. One of the mechanisms through which this occurs is via increasing sympathetic nervous system activity. The resulting increased sympathetic outflow leads to vasoconstrictive effects on blood vessels. For example, cocaine use can trigger vasospasm in coronary arteries through its actions on adrenergic receptors causing vasoconstriction. Exercise, cold weather, physical activity or exertion, mental stress, hyperventilation are additional precipitating factors.

== Pathophysiology ==
The exact pathophysiology behind coronary vasospasm has not been elucidated. Instead, a combination of different factors has been proposed to contribute to coronary vasospasm. In general, it is thought that an abnormality within a coronary artery causes it to become hyperreactive to vasoconstrictor stimuli. This abnormality can be located in one segment of the coronary artery, or it may be diffuse and present throughout the entire artery. If and when vasoconstrictor stimuli act upon the hyperreactive segment of the artery, then vasospasm can result. Ultimately, when large coronary arteries undergo vasospasm, this can lead to either complete or transient occlusion of blood flow within the artery. As a result, ischemia to the tissues served by the artery can occur. Symptoms due to ischemia can follow.

Some of the factors that have been proposed to contribute to coronary vasospasm include the following:

- Endothelial dysfunction
  - Certain vasodilatory agents exert their effects by working via the endothelium, the cells that make up the lining of blood vessels. Specifically, these agents work by enhancing the production of nitric oxide from endothelial nitric oxide synthase. Normally, nitric oxide then works to promote vasodilation in a blood vessel through its own mechanisms such as inhibiting the release of agents that cause vasoconstriction.
  - Endothelial dysfunction wherein there is a deficiency in the production of nitric oxide has been found to be associated with coronary vasospasm in some but not all cases. Vasodilatory agents with mechanisms dependent on a functional endothelial nitric oxide synthase can cause vasoconstriction instead in the setting of endothelial dysfunction, leading to coronary vasospasm.
- Chronic inflammation
  - Various markers of low-grade chronic inflammation have been found in cases of coronary vasospasm.
  - In addition to this, one of the risk factors for coronary vasospasm is smoking. Chronic inflammation due to smoking has been shown to be damaging to endothelial cell function.
- Oxidative Stress
  - Oxygen free radicals contribute to the pathogenesis of coronary vasospasm through their damaging effects on vascular endothelial cells and degrading nitric oxide, an important vasodilatory agent.
- Smooth Muscle Hypercontractility
  - At a cellular level, pathways that lead to enhanced myosin light chain phosphorylation promote vasoconstriction. Increased activity of Rho-kinase leading to enhanced myosin light chain phosphorylation has been implicated in the pathogenesis of coronary vasospasm.

== Diagnosis ==
There are no set criteria to diagnose coronary vasospasm. Thorough history taking by a clinician can assist in the diagnosis of coronary vasospasm. In cases where symptoms of chest pain are present, identifying features that distinguish episodes of vasospastic angina from traditional angina can aid in the diagnosis. Features such as chest pain at rest, a diurnal variation in tolerance for exercise with a reduction in tolerance for exercise in the morning, and responsiveness of chest pain to calcium channel blockers as opposed to beta blockers can be important clues.

EKG can occasionally be used to diagnose episodes of coronary vasospasm. However, relying on EKG is not always possible due to the transient nature of coronary vasospasm episodes. Due to the challenge of capturing episodes of coronary vasospasm spontaneously, provocative testing to induce coronary vasospasm during coronary catheterization can be used to make the diagnosis. Provocative testing relies upon the use of pharmacological agents that promote or trigger episodes of vasospasm. Agents commonly administered include ergonovine and acetylcholine. Both pharmacological agents have vasoconstrictive effects on coronary arteries. However, in the clinical setting, provocative testing is not routinely performed. The reason for this is due to the adverse effects of these pharmacological agents.

=== EKG findings ===
When coronary vasospasm causes an artery to undergo complete occlusion, an EKG might show evidence of ST-segment elevation in the leads indicative of that artery's territory. Transient ST-segment depression can also occur, usually in the setting of sub-total occlusion of an artery.

Additional EKG findings in coronary vasospasm include evidence of arrhythmias that might be induced by ischemia: ventricular premature contractions, ventricular tachycardia, ventricular fibrillation, and more.

== History ==
Chest pain due to coronary vasospasm was described in the medical literature by Prinzmetal et al. in 1959. This discovery led to this type of angina being referred to in the literature as Prinzmetal angina. A following study further distinguished this angina from classical angina pectoris due to the fact that the results showed that the patients with chest pain due to coronary vasospasm lacked evidence of atherosclerosis on cardiac catheterization. Angina due to coronary vasospasm is also known as variant angina.

During the 70's and 80's, intense research headed by Dr. Robert A. Chahine resulted in the delineation of Spasm's role in Prinzmetal's angina, allowing for easy identification and effective treatment.

== See also ==
- Myocardial bridge, a common congenital heart anomaly in which one of the coronary arteries tunnels through the heart muscle (myocardium) itself.
