= Coronary artery anomaly =

Coronary artery anomalies are variations of the coronary circulation, affecting <1% of the general population. Symptoms include chest pain, shortness of breath and syncope, although cardiac arrest may be the first clinical presentation. Several varieties are identified, with a different potential to cause sudden cardiac death.

== Physiology of coronary arteries ==
Coronary arteries are vessels supplying blood and nutrients to the heart muscle (myocardium).

Coronary arteries arise from ostia, openings of the aorta (the largest artery in the human body) at the upper third or middle third of the sinuses of Valsalva (the first part of the big pipe coming off the main pumping chamber). The walls of coronary arteries consist of three layers: the tunica intima or inner layer (possible site of lipid deposits and fibrosis, during life), the tunica media (a smooth muscle layer whose tone is modulated by the nervous system, influencing vessel diameter and resistance) and adventitia (where nervous endings are located). Normally, the initial portion of coronary arteries lies onto the external surface of the heart (epicardium) where fat deposits tend to form during life.

In normal anatomy, three essential coronary arteries are identified: right coronary artery (RCA), left anterior descending artery (LAD) and left circumflex artery (LCx). LAD and LCx usually originate from the bifurcation of a common vessel known as left main trunk or left coronary artery (LM or LCA).

Coronary arteries are identified according to the myocardial territory they feed:

1) the LAD supplies the anterior interventricular septum and anterior left ventricular free wall;

2) the LCx supplies the posterolateral left ventricular free wall;

3) the RCA supplies the right ventricular free wall;

In fact, despite a certain degree of variability in coronary artery anatomy among individuals, there is greater consistency in the regions of the heart that are supplied by the different coronary arteries.

The posterior descending artery, providing blood flow to the infero-posterior wall of the heart, originates from the RCA in 70-90% of individuals (“right coronary dominance”), whereas in 10-15% cases it originates from the LCx (“left coronary dominance”).

Coronary vessels diameter progressively decreases proceeding from their origin to the periphery. Besides the LM, LAD, LCx and RCA, arterial vessels that are large enough to be identified by clinical angiography are called “branches”, while capillaries represent the smallest peripheral vessels of the coronary tree that lack muscular tissue (and capacity to cause spasm) and are responsible for oxygen and nutrients exchange within the myocardium.

=== Normal variants, anomalies ===
Regarding coronary artery anatomy, a distinction must be provided when assessing abnormalities:

- normal: any morphological feature observed in >1% of an unselected population

- normal variant: an alternative, unusual but benign morphological feature identified in >1% of the same population (e.g. left main is absent in 1-2% of the general population with LAD and LCX originating from separate ostia - “absent left trunk” variant)

- coronary artery anomaly (CAA): a morphological feature seen in <1% of that population, capable of causing dysfunction

The prevalence of coronary artery anomalies is inconsistent across the scientific literature, but they are considered to affect <1% of the general population. Specifically, recent data came from MRI screening of a large population (more than 5000 young children) and provided a precise estimate, suggesting that coronary artery anomalies are present in 0.45% of the US population (approximately 1.300.000 people).

== Mechanism ==
Anomalous origin of a coronary artery from the opposite sinus are relevant on a clinical level due to a significant association with sudden cardiac death, if they are accompanied by intramural course. Indeed, the main feature responsible for adverse outcomes is the “intramural” course (sometimes improperly referred to as inter-arterial) characterized by an acute ostial angulation (tangential course), “slit-like” ostium (compressed inside the aortic wall), and a proximal or initial section penetrating into the aortic tunica media (coronary arteries normally take off at a 90 degree angle) with subsequent course reaching the “correct” side of the heart. As a consequence, lateral compression of the coronary artery leads to coronary luminal (inside opening) narrowing, with reduced supply of blood and oxygen to the depending myocardial tissue, that is phasic (worse in systole, the phase of cardiac contraction, and tachycardia). Furthermore, the intramural segment of the ectopic artery, located inside the aorta, is typically but variably “hypoplastic”, smaller in circumference than the distal, extramural segments (it is unable to grow properly either before or after birth).

Autonomic and/or endothelial dysfunction may occur and induce spasm and/or thrombosis at anomalous sites (and critical ischemia), although intracoronary clotting has been rarely observed. Therefore, stenosis of an intramural proximal segment, lateral compression and spastic hyperreactivity are the mechanisms that have been linked to clinical manifestation. Coronary narrowing is most likely the main process implied in ACAOS, and it may result in symptoms such as chest pain (“angina pectoris”), dyspnea (shortness of breath), palpitations, cardiac arrhythmias (heart rhythm disorders), syncope (fainting). In most cases, however, coronary artery anomalies are silent for many years and the first clinical manifestation of these pathological entities is sudden cardiac death (e.g. due to malignant arrhythmias such as ventricular fibrillation) typically after strenuous physical exertion (when arterial compression is more severe, and cardiac work is maximal) such as in young athletes or military recruits. Of note, 19-33% (in different studies) of sudden deaths in young athletes are due to coronary artery anomalies. Clinical manifestations can be found in non-athletic, older individuals and are commonly associated with hypertension and aortic dilatation with worsening degree of compression.

L-ACAOS-IM (intramural) is seen in 0.1% of young children and, among coronary anomalies, it has the highest probability of clinical repercussions, being consistently associated with sudden cardiac death following physical exercise.

Several more varieties of L-ACAOS are described:

- prepulmonic (L-ACAOS-PP): origin of the LCA (or only the LAD) from the right sinus of Valsalva (RSV) with an epicardial course (on the surface of the heart) anterior to the pulmonary outflow tract - this does not usually cause stenosis nor requires intervention (benign anomaly, unless spasm occurs);

- subpulmonary, infundibular or intraseptal (L-ACAOS-SP): the LCA (or only the LAD) originates from the RSV, initially runs inter-arterially (outside the aortic wall) then intramyocardially inside in the ventricular septum and finally epicardially in the anterior interventricular groove - this anomaly is considered benign since it is not associated with significant fixed degree of stenosis (but it could cause spasm);

- retroaortic (L-ACAOS-RA): origin of the LCA or the only LCx from the RSV or from the RCA, running behind the aortic root and at the central fibrous mitro-aortic septum – this is considered as a benign anomaly (but it could cause spasm);

- retrocardiac (L-ACAOS-RC) – LCA originates from the RCA at the atrioventricular groove - or wrap-around the apex (L-ACAOS-WA) – generally benign, unless spasm occurs.

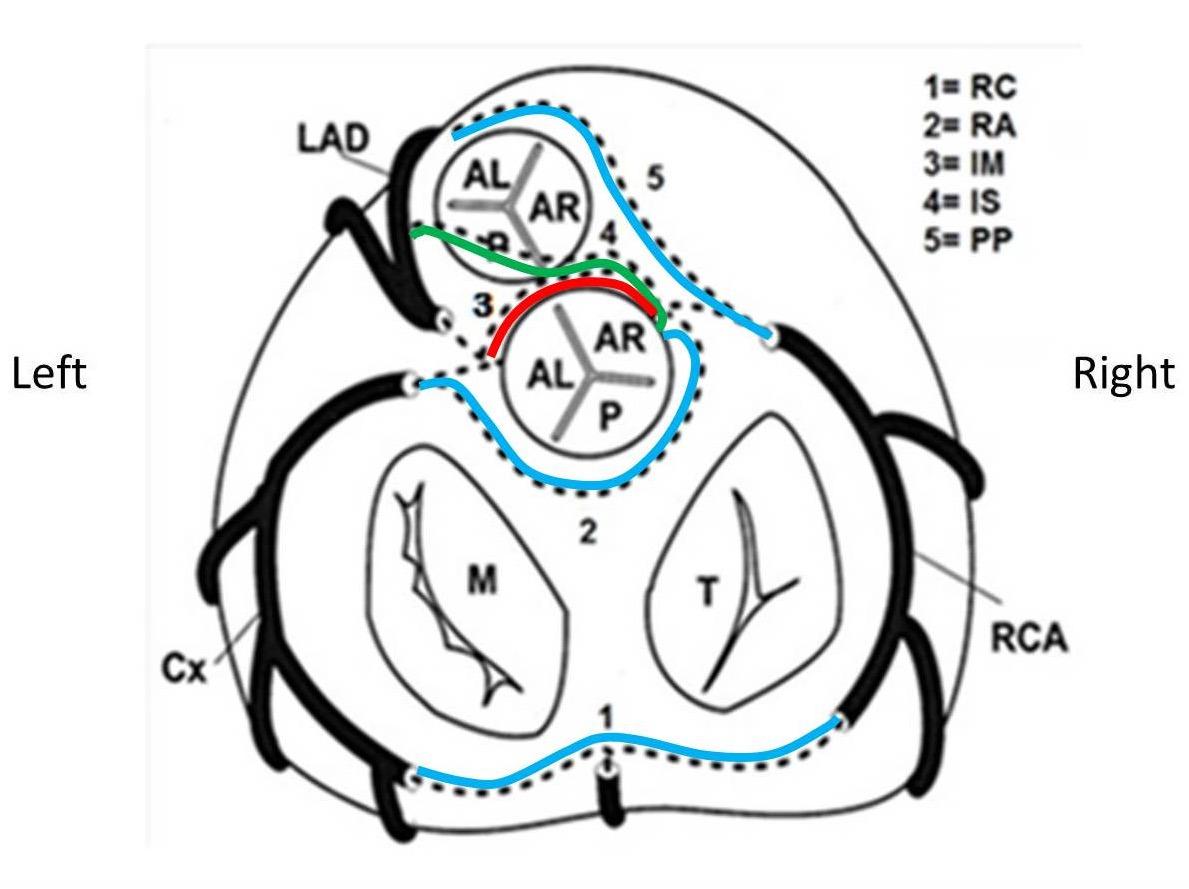
General scheme to identify possible courses of normal and ectopic coronary origin. AL = antero-left; AR = antero-right; Cx = circumflex artery; IM = intramural; IS = intraseptal; LAD = left anterior descending artery; M = mitral valve; P = posterior; PP = prepulmonic; RA = retroaortic; RC = retrocardiac; RCA = right coronary artery; T = tricuspid valve.

R-ACAOS-IM is observed in a higher percentage of cases (0.35% of adolescents) than L-ACAOS-IM but is less likely to be associated with sudden cardiac death in athletes. Varieties of R-ACAOS such as prepulmonic, retroaortic and intraseptal can occur and are considered generally benign.

The most frequent symptomatic coronary anomaly in infants and young children is anomalous origin of the left coronary artery from the pulmonary artery, which may cause acute myocardial infarction at neonatal age and requires emergent surgery at the time of diagnosis.

Anomalies at the mid segments include myocardial bridges, affecting >1% of the clinical population, and characterized by an intramyocardial course of coronary arteries within the muscle fibers. This may lead to systolic compression which is usually mild (coronary blood flow is mostly diastolic). Significant ischemia is rare in isolated myocardial bridges, and if present this is generally due to localized endothelial dysfunction with a tendency to spasm. Most myocardial bridges are benign and do not require any intervention.

Coronary artery aneurysms are defined as a > 50% increase of the vessel diameter. Some cases are congenital/idiopathic, but most are secondary to atherosclerosis or Kawasaki disease (an immuno-inflammatory disease especially targeting coronary vessels wall). Potential complications include localized thrombosis, distal embolization, rupture, or late lipid deposits.

Coronary arteriovenous fistulas are anomalies at the termination consisting of an anomalous connection of coronary arteries to coronary veins, veins of the pulmonary or systemic circulations, or to any cardiac cavity. Smaller fistulas are usually benign, and only severe cases can be complicated by aneurysmatic dilatation with potential thrombosis and distal embolization, volume overload or “blood steal” from arterial circulation and subsequent ischemia. Treatment is generally not required.

== Screening ==
There is an open debate about the cost/efficiency of generalized diagnostic screening in large populations. Carriers of coronary artery anomalies may receive positive results following stress/imaging tests. However, only in a minority of cases ischemia in the context of coronary artery anomalies is reproducible by stress or imaging testing and is mainly associated with particular conditions such as intense (maximal) exercise, which may lead to confusing results and misdiagnosis by techniques such as treadmill test or nuclear testing.

Nonetheless, routine screening of high-risk populations (e.g. individuals participating in competitive sports) should be generally encouraged in clinical practice of sports cardiologists.

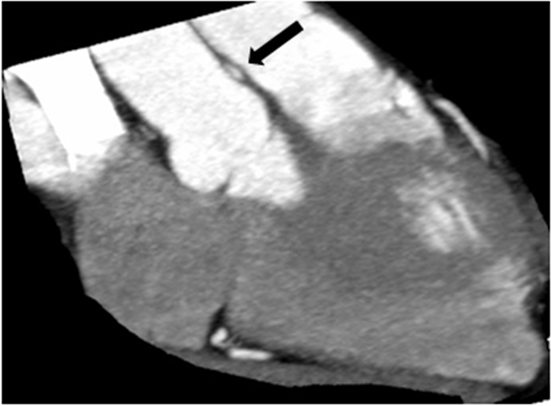
Cross-sectional computed tomography angiogram of RCA (between aorta and pulmonary artery) at the worst intramural site of compression (right anterior oblique projection). Black arrow = compressed intramural RCA.

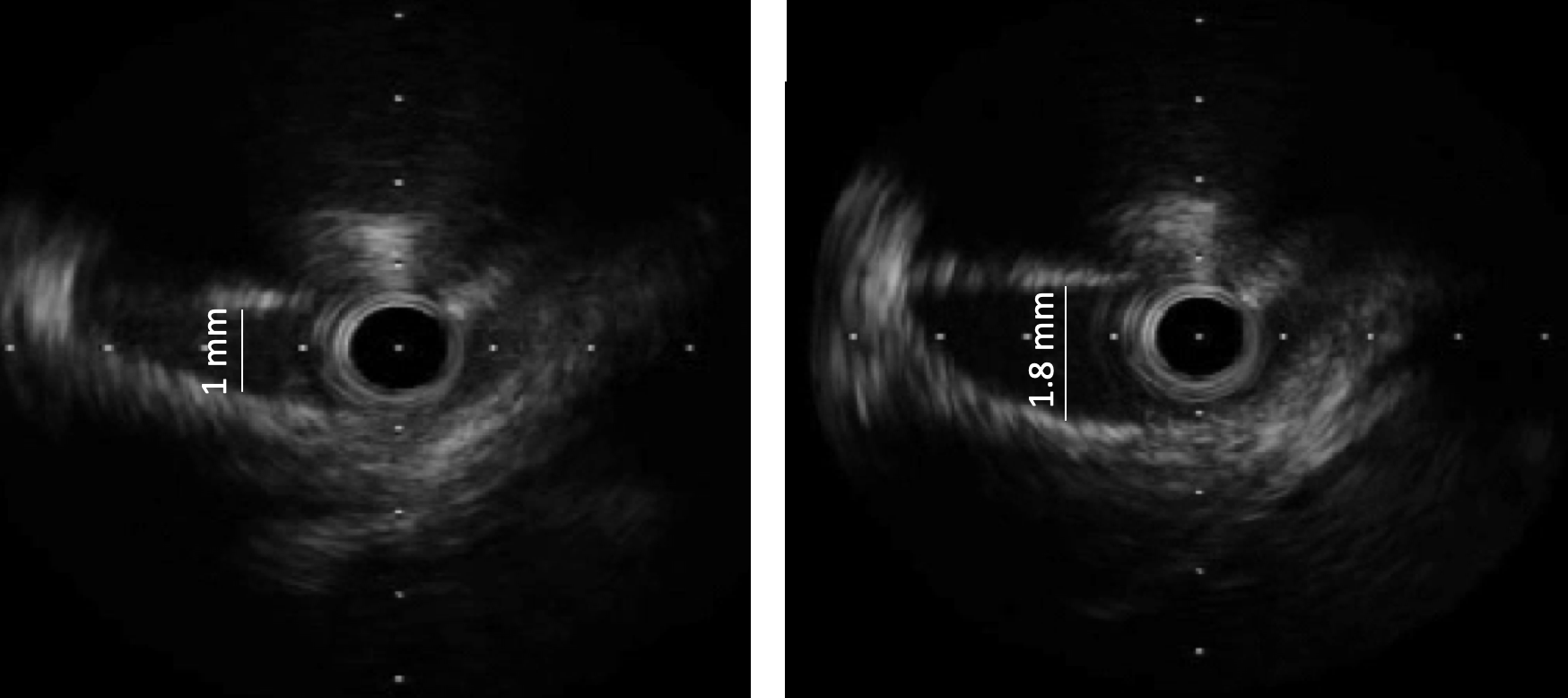
Intravascular ultrasound imaging of intramural RCA during systole (left) and diastole (right) in a patient with mild symptoms.

== Diagnosis ==
Various imaging tests have a potential to identify coronary artery anomalies. Echocardiography (ultrasound scanning of the heart) is simple, non-invasive and economical. Its use for CAAs screening is limited because its diagnostic sensitivity is highly dependent on the operator's skills and is significantly lower in larger individuals (>40 kg). The diagnostic power of echocardiography is generally poor in most cases after infancy. Especially if clinical suspicion for CAAs is high (e.g. syncope following exertion and/or history of aborted sudden cardiac death). Cardiac magnetic resonance (CMR) is an excellent tool to identify coronary artery anomalies with a significantly higher diagnostic accuracy than standard echocardiography. Compared to CMR, coronary computed tomographic angiography (CCTA) provides more precise assessment of coronary anatomy, course and degree of stenosis, but its clinical use for screening is strongly limited by its cost, the need for ionizing radiation, intravenous contrast and, in many cases, drugs administration. Assessment of severity of stenosis is best achieved by intravascular ultrasound (IVUS) imaging and it should be considered in known carriers of ACAOS-IM or that have symptoms or positive stress test results or are involved in competitive exercises. IVUS consists of cross-sectional imaging of coronary arteries in a catheterization laboratory by advancing a thin probe inside the vascular lumen, obtaining precise in-vivo information about degree of area stenosis in different arterial segments, providing a solid basis for treatment strategies.

=== Classification ===
CAAs include a wide spectrum of entities with different severity. We can schematically distinguish anomalies at the ostium, such as congenital ostial atresia or stenosis or anomalous origin of a coronary artery from the opposite sinus [ACAOS] (examples: right coronary artery anomalous origin from the opposite sinus [R-ACAOS] and left coronary artery origin from the opposite sinus [L-ACAOS]); anomalies at the mid segments (such as myocardial bridge [MB]); anomalies at the termination (such as coronary arteriovenous fistulas).

== Treatment ==
Criteria for intervention in ACAOS-IM are:

- symptoms of effort-related chest pain, shortness of breath, syncope or aborted sudden cardiac death (Class I, Level of Evidence A/B) and/or high-risk professional lifestyle.

- positive treadmill stress test, ideally by nuclear technology, in the correct dependent myocardial territory, in the presence of intramural course (Class I, Level of Evidence B)

For special populations, e.g. athletes, treatment may be indicated with specific advice of medical experts, in the absence of the previously mentioned criteria. Cut-off for stenosis severity requiring intervention is not clear, although narrowing >50% in comparison to the distal normal segment is generally accepted as a marker of severity in L-ACAOS-IM. Decisions on treatment should be guided by the patient's individual characteristics such as age, symptoms, profession and level of engagement in physical activity. Pharmacological treatment and observation may be appropriate in selected, low-risk patients. Importantly, untreated carriers of significant ACAOS should not generally engage in competitive sports or strenuous activities.

Treatment options for ACAOS-IM include both catheter-based procedures (percutaneous coronary intervention [PCI]) and surgical interventions. PCI consists of stent angioplasty of the proximal, intramural segment by placing a thin metal tube (a stent) in order to keep open the narrowed artery. PCI of R-ACAOS-IM is feasible and quite successful, but further experience is needed in L-ACAOS-IM since few cases have been treated percutaneously, while surgery is the recommended treatment in this subpopulation, at this time. Surgery consists of “unroofing” or denudation of the intramural coronary segment from the aortic wall: this approach is currently the gold standard. Coronary artery bypass grafting (CABG) and reimplantation of the ectopic artery are obsolete and not indicated, because of competitive flow in mild resting narrowings.
