= Blue toe syndrome =

- Specialty: Cardiology

Blue toe syndrome is defined as one or more toes developing discoloration that usually appears blue or purple with the absence of any obvious trauma (physical or cold-induced) and disorders that would cause blue toes. This occurs when small clots, often from atherothrombotic microembolism (clots formed from fatty deposits in artery walls), partially block blood flow to the toes.

== Overview ==
The term blue toe syndrome (BTS) was created by Karmody in 1976 BTS can cause transient focal ischemia and occasionally minor tissue loss, but generally does not affect the entire forefoot. Blue or violaceous toes can also result from trauma, cold-induced injury, disorders causing generalized cyanosis, reduced arterial blood flow, impaired venous drainage, or blood abnormalities which are different than BTS. The terms "blue toe syndrome," "grey toe syndrome," and "purple toe syndrome" are often used interchangeably.

== Diagnosis ==
There can be many underlying causes of blue toe syndrome so a diagnosis often requires a more in-depth evaluation of the patients medical history. Peripheral microembolism with distal arterial occulsion is one of the most common underlying conditions. The six primary categories of diagnosis that are outlined for blue toe syndrome include vascular obstruction, autoimmune conditions, hyperviscity syndromes, infections, drugs-induced and vasospasm. Diagnostic evaluation may include echocardiography, thoracic or abdominal CT or MRI, peripheral arterial imaging, blood tests for hypercoagulable states, and assessment for conditions that affect peripheral blood flow.

== See also ==
- Warfarin § Purple toe syndrome
- Cholesterol embolism
