= Crisscross heart =

- Other names: Criss-cross atrioventricular relationships
- Specialty: Cardiology

Crisscross heart is a type of congenital heart defect where the right atrium is closely associated with the left ventricle in space, and the left atrium is closely associated with the right ventricle. The first documented report of this heart defect was described in 1961 by Dr. Robert H. Anderson and his research team.

Although it is classified as a defect, the criss-cross is more of a spatial anomaly than a functional one, and it is possible for the heart to have relatively normal functioning. The ventricles are rotated either clockwise or counterclockwise resulting in the twisting of their connection. The actual blood flow stream through the ventricles is not interrupted.

== Etiology ==
The exact cause of the heart defect is unknown, but it is postulated to be early embryological rotation of the ventricular mass along the long-axis after the ventricular septum forms around the 7th week of embryologic development. Embryological development of the heart requires complex migration of cardiac myoblast progenitor cells beginning as a primitive tube and undergoing systematic rotation and fusion of tissue masses. This ultimately allows the fetal heart to differentiate into separate outflow tracts with a thick septum in between to divide the two ventricles. Premature cessation of this process anywhere along the development of the heart can cause downstream effects and spacial malformation of the four chambers of the heart.

In 2023, Dr. Ségolène Bernheim and her research team isolated the GREB1L gene as a possible determinant of crisscross heart in mouse models. They demonstrated that the congenital defect in crisscross heart originates from a defect in the twisting of the ventricles of the heart after septation occurs. Their research uncovered the role of GREB1L in maintaining dorsal pericardial wall precursor cells during the elongation of the embryologic heart tube. Their findings revealed the underlying cause is primarily a shortage of correctly specified cardiac progenitor cells which abruptly arrests the development of the outflow tracts.

== Symptoms and signs ==
Depending on when the crossing of the ventricles occurs during fetal development dictates the severity of symptoms and anatomical defects the individual will experience. Early rotation of the ventricular mass before the septum is fully formed can cause varying degrees of ventricular septal defects to persist leading to shortness of breath, cyanosis, pulmonary arterial hypertension, and possible formation of a single ventricle.

Crisscross heart is a very rare congenital heart defect, and results in many different symptoms, even though the heart still has the ability to perform its major function of pumping blood throughout the body. Individuals who have this disease will experience cyanosis which is a blue tint to the skin because of inadequate blood flow to the body, this symptom will be seen especially around the mouth. Other symptoms include pallor, extreme dyspnea, pulmonary valve stenosis, cardiac murmurs and a deviated ventricular septum. Pallor can be described as a pale color of the skin, and dyspnea is difficulty breathing. Pulmonary valve stenosis is the narrowing of the pulmonary valve which leads to decreased blood flow to the pulmonary artery. Cardiac murmurs are sounds that can be heard when using a stethoscope that make a swooshing noise rather than a normal “lub-dup”. Lastly a deviated ventricular septum is when there is a hole between the ventricle walls resulting in blood between the ventricles flowing freely between each other.

== Anatomy ==
In an anatomically correct heart the right atrium and right ventricle are working together to supply blood to the pulmonary artery, similarly to how the left atrium and the left ventricle work simultaneously to supply blood to the aorta. During the process of the heart contracting and releasing the right atrium and left atrium contract at the same time, while the left ventricle and right ventricle relax. In opposition, when the left atrium and right atrium are relaxed the left ventricle and right ventricle contract pushing blood to either the aorta or pulmonary artery. In an anatomically correct heart the atria are smaller than the ventricles. The ventricles include more muscle in order to push high quantities of blood throughout the body. Normal blood flow throughout the heart begins at the superior vena cava coming from the upper half of the body and the inferior vena cava coming from the lower half of the body. Next blood will be in the right atrium and will flow uninterrupted through the tricuspid valve through to the right ventricle. The blood from the right ventricle should go to the pulmonary artery via the pulmonary valve. The blood from the pulmonary vein enters the left atrium, then flows through the mitral valve to the left ventricle. After the left ventricle is filled with blood the aortic valve opens allowing blood to go through, which the blood then enters the aorta and goes to the rest of the body.

In an anatomically correct heart, the right ventricle is positioned inferiorly to the left ventricle with both chambers of the heart positioned inferior to their respective atria. The atria and ventricles are in vertically positioned, almost parallel to one another, in a cranial-caudal axis on a coronal plane. In crisscross heart, the corresponding chambers are positioned in a horizontal fashion with the right ventricle superior to the left ventricle providing the signature "crisscross" appearance of the heart on imaging.

== Diagnosis ==
Crisscross heart, like many other congenital heart defects, can be diagnosed via echocardiogram, angiocardiogram, or cardiac MRI. The main diagnostic imaging modality is echocardiography which is quick, non-invasive, and involves no radiation which is ideal for prenatal screening and early recognition of this condition. Imaging will show crossing of the atrioventricular connections with the short-axis views revealing the right ventricle superior to the left ventricle with horizontal positioning of the ventricular septum.

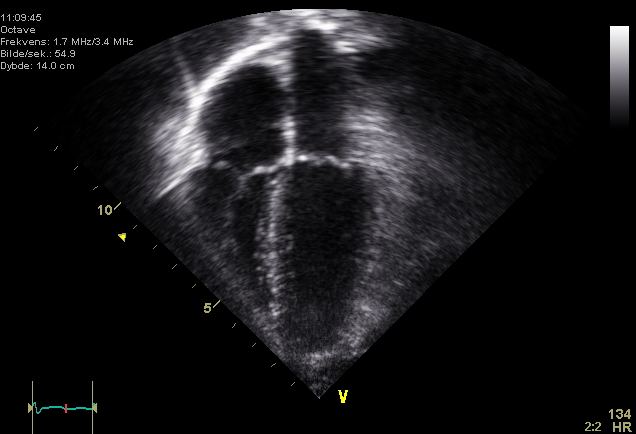
Echocardiogram. Four-chamber transverse view of anatomical heart.

=== Initial imaging findings ===
Characteristic sonographic findings of crisscross heart on echocardiographic imaging;

1. The inability to obtain a four-chamber view of the heart through standard transverse view through the fetal chest.
2. Misaligned spatial atrioventricular connection of the inter-ventricular septum seen in a 'spiraling' pattern.
3. Four-chamber view of the fetal heart on sagittal plane imaging of the fetal chest.

=== Additional imaging findings ===
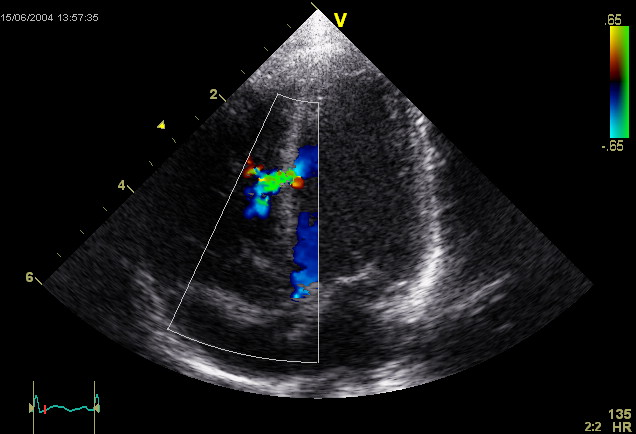
Echocardiographic imaging of ventricular septal defect

Crisscross heart often presents with other congenital heart defects. In addition to the crossed nature of the two ventricles, echocardiography could reveal pulmonary artery stenosis or ventricular septal defects within the heart. Another possible rare finding is double outlet right ventricle in which the aorta and pulmonary trunk both originate from the right ventricle outflow tract instead of the aorta being positioned above the left ventricle.

== Treatment ==
Pulmonary valve stenosis

The rotated ventricles indicative of crisscross heart generally pose no threat to the patient. But associated severe anatomic defects can be fatal if left unaddressed. Definitive treatment is aimed at fixing large septal defects and pulmonary valve stenosis rather than the rotated heart itself. Due to the complexity of the native heart anatomy, staged surgical repair with careful planning through various imaging modalities is necessary to correct the defect. The extent of surgical intervention depends on what cardiac defects are present.

=== Pulmonary artery stenosis ===
Patients with severe or critical cases of pulmonary artery stenosis require monitoring during pregnancy with interventions planned immediately after delivery. Postnatal treatment includes prostaglandin E1 to keep the ductus arteriosus open with subsequent definitive therapy using percutaneous balloon valvuloplasty. Prompt repair of the valvular stenosis can reduce long-term complications such as pulmonary hypoplasia and atresia.

=== Ventricular septal defect ===
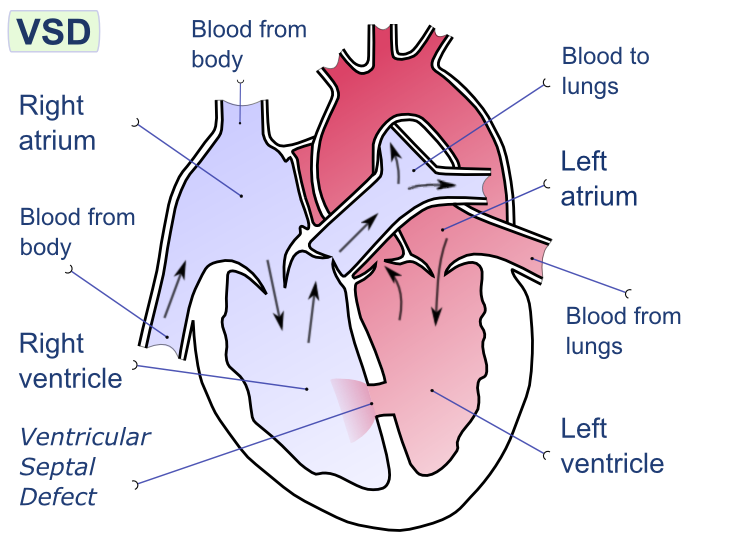
Ventricular septal defect

Management options for ventricular septal defects are based on the size of the defect present. Small defects in the ventricular septum pose very little risk to the patient and a majority of cases close on their own as the individual ages. Individuals with larger defects requires careful resection of the cardiac tissue and repair of the septal defect commonly through a periventricular approach or transcatheter techniques.
