= Cor triatriatum =

- Other names: Triatrial heart
- Specialty: Cardiology
- Symptoms: Dyspnea, Fatigue, Pulmonary hypertension, Congestive heart failure
- Complications: Atrial fibrillation, Stroke, Heart failure
- Usual onset: Congenital
- Causes: Congenital defect; abnormal development of the pulmonary venous system
- Diagnostic method: Echocardiography, Computed tomography, Magnetic resonance imaging
- Treatment: Surgical resection of the membrane; management of associated conditions
- Prognosis: Good with timely surgical intervention
- Frequency: Rare (0.1% of congenital heart defects)

Cor triatriatum (or triatrial heart) is a congenital heart defect where the left atrium (cor triatriatum sinistrum) or right atrium (cor triatriatum dextrum) is subdivided by a thin membrane, resulting in three atrial chambers (hence the name).

Cor triatriatum represents 0.1% of all congenital cardiac malformations and may be associated with other cardiac defects in as many as 50% of cases. The membrane may be complete or may contain one or more fenestrations of varying size.

Cor triatriatum sinistrum is more common. In this defect, there is typically a proximal chamber that receives the pulmonic veins and a distal (true) chamber located more anteriorly where it empties into the mitral valve. The membrane that separates the atrium into two parts varies significantly in size and shape. It may appear similar to a diaphragm or be funnel-shaped, band-like, entirely intact (imperforate) or contain one or more openings (fenestrations) ranging from small, restrictive-type to large and widely open.

In the pediatric population, this anomaly may be associated with major congenital cardiac lesions such as tetralogy of Fallot, double outlet right ventricle, coarctation of the aorta, partial anomalous pulmonary venous connection, persistent left superior vena cava with unroofed coronary sinus, ventricular septal defect, atrioventricular septal (endocardial cushion) defect, and common atrioventricular canal. Rarely, asplenia or polysplenia has been reported in these patients. In the adult, cor triatriatum is frequently an isolated finding.

== Cause ==
Cor triatriatum dextrum is extremely rare and results from the complete persistence of the right sinus valve of the embryonic heart. The membrane divides the right atrium into a proximal (upper) and a distal (lower) chamber. The upper chamber receives the venous blood from both vena cavae and the lower chamber is in contact with the tricuspid valve and the right atrial appendage.

== Mechanism and Symptoms ==
The natural history of this defect depends on the size of the communicating orifice between the upper and lower atrial chambers. If the communicating orifice is small, the patient is critically ill and may succumb at a young age (usually during infancy) to congestive heart failure and pulmonary edema. If the connection is larger, patients may present in childhood or young adulthood with a clinical picture similar to that of mitral stenosis. As the malformed membrane calcifies with age, thus further narrowing such opening, decreased cardiac output produces features of pulmonary venous hypertension and right heart failure—including symptoms of dyspnea and orthopnea, easy fatigability, palpitations and shortness of breath, among others. Cor triatriatum may also be an incidental finding when it is nonobstructive.

== Diagnosis ==
Primarily diagnosed with imaging, such as echocardiogram (ultrasound of the heart), CT, and/or MRI.

== Treatment ==
Treatment of Cor triatriatum varies among cases and is dependent upon presentation of symptoms—incidental finding of the condition in asymptomatic patients does not typically require immediate medical management, but for those exhibiting dyspnea and pulmonary congestion, surgical intervention is required. The disorder can be treated surgically by removing the membrane dividing the atrium. The surgery, which usually occurs by first excising the diaphragm and then closing the atrial septum, has a reported survival of 90% at five years, with almost all patients becoming asymptomatic post-surgery.

== Sources ==
- Church, W.S. (1868). "Congenital malformation of heart-abnormal septum in left auricle". Trans Pathol Soc Lond. 19: 188–190.
- Griffith TW (April 1903). "Note on a Second Example of Division of the Cavity of the Left Auricle into Two Compartments by a Fibrous Band". J Anat Physiol. 37 (Pt 3): 255–7. PMC 1287112. PMID 17232557.
- Anderson RH (July 1992). "Understanding the nature of congenital division of the atrial chambers". Br Heart J. 68 (1): 1–3. doi:10.1136/hrt.68.7.1. PMC 1024958. PMID 1515284.
- Richardson JV, Doty DB, Siewers RD, Zuberbuhler JR (February 1981). "Cor triatriatum (subdivided left atrium)". J Thorac Cardiovasc Surg. 81 (2): 232–8. PMID 7453233.
- Trento A, Zuberbuhler JR, Anderson RH, Park SC, Siewers RD (September 1988). "Divided right atrium (prominence of the eustachian and thebesian valves)". J Thorac Cardiovasc Surg. 96 (3): 457–63. PMID 3045428.
- Marín-García J, Tandon R, Lucas RV, Edwards JE (January 1975). "Cor triatriatum: study of 20 cases". Am J Cardiol. 35 (1): 59–66. doi:10.1016/0002-9149(75)90559-7. PMID 122785.
- Niwayama G (February 1960). "Cor triatriatum". Am Heart J. 59: 291–317. doi:10.1016/0002-8703(60)90287-8. PMID 14427395.
- Nassar PN, Hamdan RH (January 2011). "Cor Triatriatum Sinistrum: Classification and Imaging Modalities". Eur J Cardiovasc Med. 1 (3): 84–87. doi:10.5083/ejcm.20424884.21. PMC 3286827. PMID 22379596.
- Jennings RB, Innes BJ (September 1977). "Subtotal cor triatriatum with left partial anomalous pulmonary venous return. Successful surgical repair in an infant". J Thorac Cardiovasc Surg. 74 (3): 461–6. PMID 895180.
- Tuccillo B, Stümper O, Hess J, van Suijlen RJ, Bos E, Roelandt JR, Sutherland GR (February 1992). "Transoesophageal echocardiographic evaluation of atrial morphology in children with congenital heart disease". Eur Heart J. 13 (2): 223–31. doi:10.1093/oxfordjournals.eurheartj.a060151. PMID 1555621.
- Wolf WJ (1986). "Diagnostic features and pitfalls in the two-dimensional echocardiographic evaluation of a child with cor triatriatum". Pediatr Cardiol. 6 (4): 211–3. doi:10.1007/BF02311001. PMID 3703693.
- Beller B, Childers R, Eckner F, Duchelle R, Ranniger K, Rabinowitz M (May 1967). "Cor triatriatum in the adult. Complicated by mitral insufficiency and aortic dissection". Am J Cardiol. 19 (5): 749–54. doi:10.1016/0002-9149(67)90482-1. PMID 6023473.
