= Aortopulmonary septal defect =

- Specialty: Cardiology

Aortopulmonary septal defect is a rare congenital heart disorder accounting for only 0.1-0.3% of congenital heart defects worldwide. It is characterized by a communication between the aortic and pulmonary arteries, with preservation of two normal semilunar valves. It is the result of an incomplete separation of the aorticopulmonary trunk that normally occurs in early fetal development with formation of the spiral septum. Aortopulmonary septal defects occur in isolation in about half of cases, the remainder are associated with more complex heart abnormalities.

== Diagnosis ==
=== Subtypes ===
There are numerous types, differentiated by the extent of the defect. These types are:

- Type I: simple defects leading to communication between the ascending aorta and pulmonic trunk
- Type II: defects that extend to the origin of the right pulmonary artery
- Type III: anomalous origin of the right pulmonary artery from the ascending aorta

It is also classified as simple or complex. Simple defects are those that do not require surgical repair, occur with no other defects, or those that require minor straight-forward repair (ductus arteriosus, atrial septal defect). Complex defects are those that occur with other anatomical anomalies or require non-standard repair.
