= Obliterating endarteritis =

- Other names: Obliterating arteritis
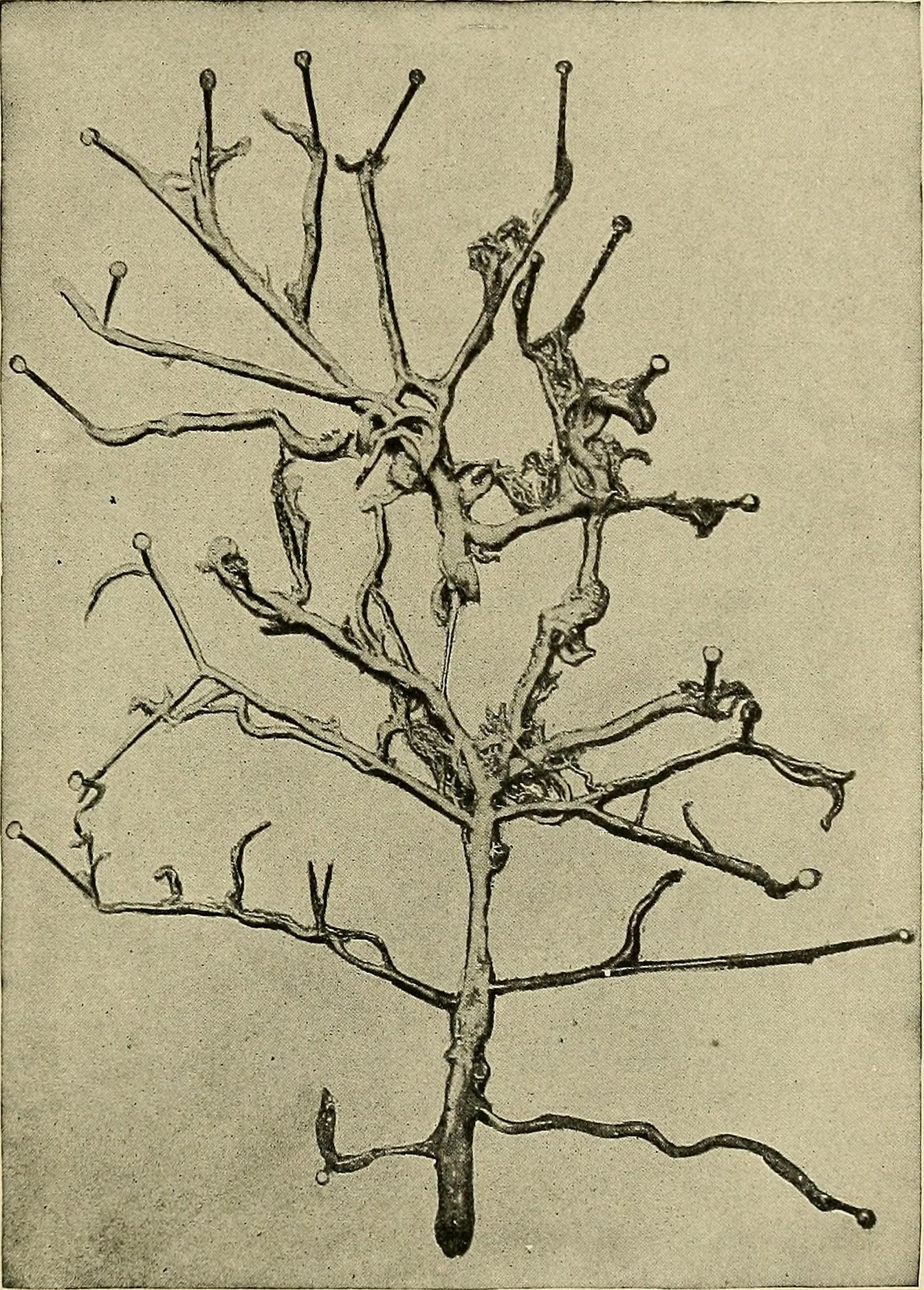
- Obliterating endarteritis of the arteries of the brain, causing destruction and deformation
- Causes: it occurs with chronic inflammation and it is a specific character of chronic inflammation

Obliterating endarteritis is severe proliferating endarteritis (inflammation of the intima or inner lining of an artery) that results in an occlusion of the lumen of the artery. Obliterating endarteritis can occur due to a variety of medical conditions such as a complication of radiation poisoning, a late side effect of radiation therapy treatments, tuberculosis meningitis or a syphilis infection.
