= Vasospasm =

Blood vessels narrowing due to arterial spasm

- Specialty: Cardiology, neurosurgery

Vasospasm refers to a condition in which an arterial spasm leads to vasoconstriction. This can lead to tissue ischemia (insufficient blood flow) and tissue death (necrosis).

Along with physical resistance, vasospasm is a main cause of ischemia. Like physical resistance, vasospasms can occur due to atherosclerosis. Vasospasm is the major cause of Prinzmetal's angina.

Cerebral vasospasm may arise in the context of subarachnoid hemorrhage as symptomatic vasospasm (or delayed cerebral ischemia), where it is a major contributor to post-operative stroke and mortality. Vasospasm typically appears 4 to 10 days after subarachnoid hemorrhage, however the relationship between radiological arterial spasm (seen on angiography) and clinical neurological deterioration is nuanced and uncertain.

== Pathophysiology ==
Normally endothelial cells release prostacyclin and nitric oxide (NO) which induce relaxation of the smooth muscle cells, and reduce aggregation of platelets. Aggregating platelets stimulate ADP to act on endothelial cells and help them induce relaxation of the smooth muscle cells. However, aggregating platelets also stimulate thromboxane A2 and serotonin which can induce contraction of the smooth muscle cells. In general, the relaxations outweighs the contractions.

In atherosclerosis, a dysfunctional endothelium is observed on examination. It does not stimulate as much prostacyclin and NO to induce relaxation on smooth muscle cells. Also there is not as much inhibition of aggregation of platelets. In this case, the greater aggregation of platelets produce ADP, serotonin, and thromboxane A2. However the serotonin and the thromboxane A2 cause more contraction of the smooth muscle cells and as a result contractions outweigh the relaxations.

== Complications ==
Vasospasm can occur in a wide variety of peripheral vascular beds under poorly understood mechanisms. Prinzmetal angina, Buerger's disease, contrast mediated selective renal vasospasm, hypercoagulability and cryoglobulinemia likely represent just a few of the known pieces of this puzzling phenomena. Ischemia in the heart due to prolonged coronary vasospasm can lead to angina, myocardial infarction and even death. Vasospasm in the hands and fingers due to prolonged exposure to vibration (30 – 300 Hz) and triggered by cold can lead to Hand-arm vibration syndrome in which feeling and manual dexterity are lost.

=== Angiography ===
In angiography, vascular access through femoral and axillary arteries are preferred because they are less prone to vasospasm. Meanwhile, brachial artery is more prone to vasospasm during instrumental access.

=== Hypothermia rewarming ===
In a case study in 2000, following surgery for head trauma, a patient developed mild hypothermia, a typical defense mechanism the brain uses to protect itself after injury. After the hypothermia rewarming period, the patient died from increased intracranial pressure and anisocoria. A sample of the cerebrospinal fluid and autopsy results indicated cerebral vasospasm.

== Treatment ==
The occurrence of vasospasm can be reduced by preventing the occurrence of atherosclerosis. This can be done in several ways, the most important being lifestyle modifications—decreasing low-density lipoprotein (LDL), quitting smoking, physical activity, and control for other risk factors including diabetes, obesity, and hypertension. Pharmacological therapies include hypolipidemic agents, thrombolytics and anticoagulants. Pharmacological options for reducing the severity and occurrence of ischemic episodes include the organic nitrates, which are rapidly metabolized to release nitric oxide in many tissues, and are classified as having either long-acting (i.e. isosorbide dinitrate) or short-acting (i.e. nitroglycerin) durations of action.

These drugs work by increasing nitric oxide levels in the blood and inducing coronary vasodilation which will allow for more coronary blood flow due to a decreased coronary resistance, allowing for increased oxygen supply to the vital organs (myocardium). The nitric oxide increase in the blood resulting from these drugs also causes dilation of systemic veins which in turn causes a reduction in venous return, ventricular work load and ventricular radius. All of these reductions contribute to the decrease in ventricular wall stress which is significant because this causes the demand of oxygen to decrease. In general organic nitrates decrease oxygen demand and increase oxygen supply. It is this favourable change to the body that can decrease the severity of ischemic symptoms, particularly angina.

Other medications used to reduce the occurrence and severity of vasospasm and ultimately ischemia include L-type calcium channel blockers (notably nimodipine, as well as verapamil, diltiazem, nifedipine) and beta-receptor antagonists (more commonly known as beta blockers or β-blockers) such as propranolol.

L-type calcium channel blockers can induce dilation of the coronary arteries while also decreasing the heart's demand for oxygen by reducing contractility, heart rate, and wall stress. The reduction of these latter three factors decreases the contractile force that the myocardium must exert in order to achieve the same level of cardiac output.

Beta-receptor antagonists do not cause vasodilation, but like L-type calcium channel blockers, they do reduce the heart's demand for oxygen. This reduction similarly results from a decrease in heart rate, afterload, and wall stress.

=== Adverse effects ===
Like most pharmacological therapeutic options, there are risks that should be considered. For these drugs in particular, vasodilation can be associated with some adverse effects which might include orthostatic hypotension, reflex tachycardia, headaches and palpitations. Tolerance may also develop over time due compensatory response of the body, as well as depletion of -SH groups of glutathione which are essential for the metabolism of the drugs to their active forms.

Potential side effects:

- Verapamil: hypotension, bradycardia, constipation
- Diltiazem: hypotension, bradycardia, risk of heart block
- Nifedipine: hypotension
- Propranolol: asystole, asthma attacks

=== Contraindications ===
Organic nitrates should not be taken with PDE5 inhibitors (i.e. sildenafil) since both NO and PDE5 inhibitors increase cyclic GMP levels and the sum of their pharmacodynamic effects will greatly exceed the optimal therapeutic levels. What you could see upon taking both medications at the same time, as caused by the much higher induction of relaxation of smooth muscle cells, include a severe drop in blood pressure.

Beta-receptor antagonists should be avoided in patients with reactive pulmonary disease to avoid asthma attacks. Also Beta-receptor antagonists should be avoided in patients with AV node dysfunction and/or patients on other medications which might cause bradycardia (i.e. calcium channel blockers). The potential for these contraindications and drug-drug interaction could lead to asystole and cardiac arrest.

Certain calcium channel blocker should be avoided with some beta-receptor blockers since they may cause severe bradycardia and other potential side effects.

=== Corrective therapy ===
Since vasospasms can be caused by atherosclerosis and contribute to the severity of ischemia there are some surgical options which can restore circulation to these ischemic areas. Regarding coronary vasospasm, one surgical intervention, referred to as percutaneous coronary intervention or angioplasty, involves placing a stent at the site of stenosis in an artery and inflating the stent using a balloon catheter. Another surgical intervention is coronary artery bypass.

== See also ==
- Coronary artery vasospasm
- Raynaud's phenomenon, a vasospastic disorder
- Reversible cerebral vasoconstriction syndrome
