= Myocardial bridge =

Birth defect of a coronary artery through the heart muscle

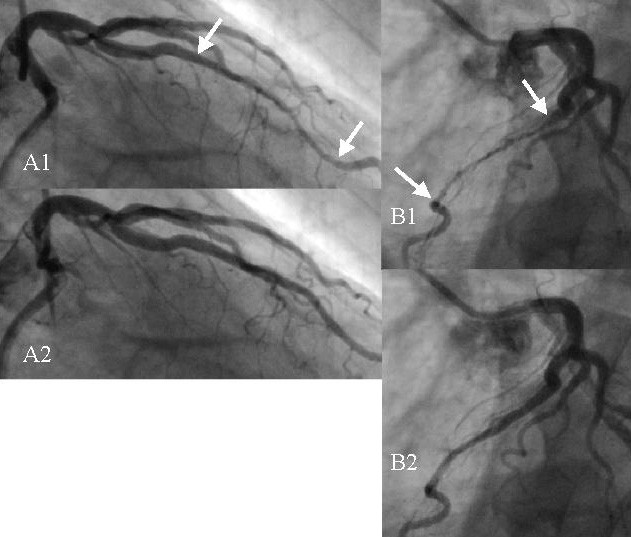
- Angiogram showing myocardial bridging resulting in arterial compression.
- Specialty: Cardiology

A myocardial bridge (MB) is a common congenital heart anomaly in which one of the coronary arteries tunnels through the heart muscle (myocardium) itself.

In most people, the coronary arteries rest on top of the heart muscle and feed blood down into smaller vessels (e.g. the septal arteries) which then carry blood to the heart muscle itself (i.e. populate throughout the myocardium). However, if a band of muscle forms around one of the coronary arteries during the fetal stage of development, then a myocardial bridge is formed – a "bridge" of heart muscle over the artery.

Every time the heart squeezes to pump blood, the band of muscle exerts pressure and it very rarely constricts the artery, reducing blood flow to the heart. Even a very thin ex. <1 mm and/or short ex. 20 mm MB can cause significant symptoms, although this has not been completely proven. MBs can range in length from a few millimetres to 10 cm or more.

The overall prevalence of myocardial bridge is at 19%, although the prevalence found at autopsies is much higher (42%). Myocardial bridge is usually a harmless condition, and in many cases bridges don't seem to cause any symptoms. However, some people with myocardial bridges may experience angina, or chest pain.

== Symptoms and signs ==
While many people have very tiny myocardial bridges that cause no symptoms, others have longer and/or deeper bridges causing significant symptoms, including children. For example, some patients cannot run or exercise at all, others can exercise despite symptoms such as shortness of breath or feelings of tightness in the chest, and still others find improvement of symptoms during exercise. Many competitive athletes have had severe myocardial bridges and unroofing surgery.

The symptoms of myocardial bridges differ slightly from patient to patient depending on the length, depth, and location of the bridge. Common symptoms include:

- Dizziness
- Shortness of breath
- Fatigue
- Chest pain/angina
- Palpitations/arrhythmia i.e. irregular heart rhythm
- Squeezing/tightness/pressure/pain in chest, shoulder, jaw, armpit, neck, and/or down the arm
- Inability to exercise, walk, do chores, have to sit/lie down
- Feeling like chest is “going to explode”
- Feeling of something “clamping down” in the chest
- Fainting/passing out (syncope) and/or feeling like one is about to faint

=== Complications ===
Myocardial bridges can cause numerous complications – which are often as misunderstood in the medical community as the condition itself. These include:

- angina pectoris (chest pain radiating from the heart)
- endothelial dysfunction, which causes vasospasms – both sometimes very severe
- arrhythmia (irregular heartbeats)
- tachycardia (abnormally high heart rate)
- plaque forming just before (proximal to) the myocardial bridge

Note that studies have shown that plaque does not form inside myocardial bridges, yet there is virtually always plaque just before the myocardial bridge in adults.

Some common triggers of myocardial bridge symptoms are:

- exertion/exercise
- anything that raises the heart rate, even positive events
- low-oxygen environments ex. hot humid weather, high altitude
- sitting/lying/doing nothing for long periods

Notably, high heart rate or tachycardia greatly increases ischemia (low oxygen to the heart) caused by myocardial bridges. Studies have shown that this is because the compressed artery reopens only very slowly each heartbeat and thus stays in a state of semi-compression for most or all of the diastolic period. Thus as the heart rate increases, the time the artery has to reopen (diastolic period) decreases dramatically – to the point that with very high heart rates, the artery never fully reopens and blood flow is constantly reduced.

== Diagnosis ==
There are three key tests currently used to diagnose myocardial bridges by Stanford University: CT scan, cardiac catheterization, and stress ultrasound.

1. CT scan – on which the myocardial bridge often appears as a compressed or squashed area of the artery in which, notably, the fatty areas surrounding the artery (shown in black on CT scans) disappear, since the artery is tunneling through muscle not fat in this area. CTs often allow an assessment of an approximate length and depth of the myocardial bridge, but compression cannot be assessed accurately from a CT scan.
2. IVUS cardiac catheterization including dFFR measured during dobutamine challenge – from which readings of dFFR and percentage compression as well as measurements of the approximate length and depth (shown as the halo or echolucent band) of the MB are taken. It is critical to note that in order to be meaningful in diagnosing a myocardial bridge, it is critical to measure dFFR i.e. the diastolic period, not mean FFR. This is because, contrary to a common misconception, myocardial bridges cause compression of the artery during diastole as well as systole, as explained above. This has been shown in multiple studies. It is also critical that the dobutamine challenge be used, elevating the heart rate, because dFFR decreases significantly at high heart rates as shown by Yoshino et al., 2014.
3. Stress echocardiogram (i.e. before and after running on a treadmill) – used to identify evidence of ischemia i.e. a lack of oxygen delivered to the ventricle due to the MB. This test does not visualize the MB itself but rather its effects on the ventricle. Multiple studies have shown that ischemia from MBs is indicated by the appearance "septal buckling" in the stress echocardiogram, as the septum gives out under stress., which a 2013 paper by Lin et al. describes as "a transient focal buckling in the end-systolic to early-diastolic motion of the septum with apical sparing which correlates prospectively with the presence of LAD MB."

As much of the science of testing for MBs is relatively new, patients frequently go undiagnosed. Stanford's center for myocardial bridges has offered second opinion services from a distance for some ten years, including to numerous international patients.

Notably, EKG is not a reliable or conclusive diagnostic tool for diagnosing MBs. Some symptomatic MB patients show normal EKG results and others abnormal.

Many doctors have suggested that there is a need for more awareness of MBs among doctors and better testing, including testing of young people as the disease is congenital. According to a 2007 study:

Clinical suspicion of a myocardial bridge would be warranted in all cases of typical or atypical chest pain in subjects who have a low probability of atherosclerosis because they are free from the traditional cardiovascular risk factors, particularly in the young.

— Chiara Ripa, MD, et al.

A 2017 article in Stanford Medical Center's official blog Scope explains the hardships people with MB face, including the dismissal of their symptoms and obstacles in their lives as a result of the lack of MB education amongst cardiologists:

Many of these patients have these heartbreaking stories to tell. They can’t hold a job, they can’t travel, they can’t take care of their families. Most cardiologists are completely at a loss. They know myocardial bridges exist, but they have been taught they are benign and never cause problems... When these patients go to the ER, and they go there a lot, all the cardiology tests come back normal. They’re told, 'Here’s a little Valium. I think you’re anxious.' They get belittled, not taken seriously, and they get really depressed.

— Dr. Ingela Schnittger, MD.

== Treatment ==
Myotomy, commonly known as unroofing surgery, is the first-line surgical treatment for myocardial bridges. It is the only treatment that actually removes the myocardial bridge itself, releasing the artery from compression. Unroofing surgery today is done via open heart (sternum), thoracotomy (through the ribs), and also using robot-assisted surgery (through tiny keyholes in the chest). Full open heart surgery is usually reserved for very large myocardial bridges and/or specific situations that make thoracotomy difficult. By far, Stanford University has done more unroofing surgeries than any other hospital in the world, with over 200 unroofings completed since starting a decade ago. In 2019, University of Chicago surgeon Dr. Husam Balkhy emerged as a provider of robotic-assisted unroofing surgery, with some patients being possible candidates for this route.

If done properly, unroofing removes the entire band of muscle affecting the artery, restoring more blood flow. Stanford University Medical Center's 2016 study by Pargaonkar et al. showed that unroofing surgery “significantly improves anginal symptoms” and improves “all five dimensions of the SAQ” i.e. Seattle Angina Questionnaire. Some residual symptoms caused by complications from a lifetime of living with a myocardial bridge may continue after unroofing surgery such as endothelial dysfunction, vasospasm, plaque, narrowed artery. However, these often improve slowly over a year or more once the myocardial bridge is gone.

A few cases have occurred in various hospitals in which patients have not been completely unroofed, leaving segments of the MB, resulting in lingering symptoms.

A critical point is that the endothelial dysfunction and vasospasms caused by myocardial bridges cannot start to heal until unroofing surgery is done, because the MB continues to squeeze on the artery, damaging the artery lining.

Bypass surgery is not the first line treatment for myocardial bridges for two main reasons:

1. Competitive flow problem – blood can flow the wrong way, such as continuing to flow down the original artery instead of the new artery that has been grafted on.
2. Jailed septal arteries still jailed – a jailed artery is a septal artery (a branch off the coronary artery) that lies inside the myocardial bridge and is thus also compressed with each heartbeat. Septal arteries are critical as they carry blood into the heart septum. Bypass surgery alone does not remedy jailed septal arteries, which still do not get blood flow.

Notably, many myocardial bridge patients have had bypass surgery only to later need unroofing surgery after the bypass proved unsuccessful.

However, papers by Ekeke et al., 2015 have shown bypass surgery is helpful as an addition to supplement unroofing surgery, but only when there is significant plaque just before (proximal to) the myocardial bridge or anatomic anomalies increase the risk of recurrence of such plaque. A 2013 Russian study by Bockeria et al. concludes that this competitive flow problem is much more likely to occur if the LIMA artery is used for the graft rather than the SVG, so the SVG is recommended.

Stents are never indicated as a treatment for myocardial bridges because trials have shown they are prone to breaking when the artery is squeezed each heartbeat.

Unroofing surgery has been performed in the United States, Belgium, Spain, Italy, England, China, Russia, United Arab Emirates, and Singapore, among other countries. Hospitals that have performed unroofing surgery include:

- Stanford University Medical Center – surgeon Dr. Jack Boyd; team leader Dr. Ingela Schnittger
- University of Chicago Medical Center – surgeon Dr. Husam Balkhy
- Mayo Clinic, Rochester, Minnesota
- Cleveland Clinic
- Cleveland Clinic Abu Dhabi – surgeon Dr. Johannes Bonatti (currently in Austria)
- Texas Heart Institute
- Kaiser Permanente, Santa Clara, CA – Dr. David Scoville
- Baylor Scott and White Hospital, Texas – surgeon Dr. Jeffrey Wu
- Spectrum Health Butterworth Hospital, Michigan – Dr. Marzia Leacche
- Hospital de las Cruces, Barakaldo, Basque Country, Spain – Dr. Crespo and Dr. Aramendi
- Istanbul University Hospital – Dr. Ihsan Bakir
- St Francis Hospital and Heart, NYC - Dr. Newell Robinson
- National University Hospital, Singapore - Dr. Theodoros Kofidis

In many other countries, including a number of highly developed countries such as the UK, Australia, New Zealand, Ireland and Sweden, unroofing surgery for myocardial bridges remains unavailable, and in some, the condition remains unrecognized as a medical problem.

== Prevalence ==
The true prevalence of MBs is still largely unknown, as studies have made vastly different assessments. As a 2017 Stanford paper points out:

Estimations of the prevalence of MBs vary... at least in part as a result of several key variables, including the means of identification (eg, computed tomography (CT), intravascular ultrasound (IVUS), or autopsy), which vessels are examined, and which definition of a bridge is applied (eg, only a “deep” bridge vs both “superficial” and “deep” bridges). Perhaps the most fundamental variable is whether an MB is even considered. Unlike hypertrophic cardiomyopathy, which will usually be obvious to the pathologist, MBs can be easily obscured by epicardial and pericardial fat. As such, autopsy series have estimated the prevalence between 5% and 86%. The largest autopsy report, which included 1056 subjects, found a prevalence of 26%, 88% of which involved the LAD. One population-based study with CT estimated a prevalence of 22.5%. As a result of these studies and others, an estimated prevalence of approximately 25% is generally accepted.

— Ian S. Rogers, MD, MPH, et al.

== History ==
According to Stanford University Medical Center, MBs are often misunderstood by doctors, who may have been taught that the condition is always benign. As a result, patients are often denied treatment. But a great deal of science has emerged in the past decade to clarify the condition. In particular, Stanford has published over 15 articles on MBs since 2014. One commonly recurring reason for denial of treatment is the myth that myocardial bridges do not significantly affect blood flow. But this myth has been debunked by Stanford and also Daoud and Wafa 2012 who say:

Normally, only 15% of coronary blood flow occurs during systole and because myocardial bridging is a systolic event on angiography, its clinical significance and relevance have been questioned. [However] angiographic and intravascular ultrasonographic studies demonstrated that vessel compression during systole is followed by the delay in the increase in luminal diameter during diastole, thus affecting the predominant phase of coronary perfusion, especially during episodes of tachycardia. These data suggest that angina, acute coronary syndromes, and arrhythmias in patients with myocardial bridging may be explained by the reduced ischemic threshold.”

In other words, while the myocardial bridge itself only compresses the artery while the heart squeezes (systolic period), which is only 15% of the time in the heartbeat cycle, in fact, the artery stays compressed long after the heart relaxes. This is because arteries are sturdy and pliable, so after being compressed they are very slow to reopen, remaining in some level of semi-compression for most if not all of the diastolic period i.e. the other 85% of the heartbeat cycle (hence the critical need for dFFR testing in diagnosing myocardial bridges). Thus the coronary artery is fully open to allow normal blood flow for only a small percentage of each heartbeat cycle. This problem is further exacerbated by tachycardia, which can bring the duration of normal blood flow to zero, as explained below. Dr. Ingela Schnittger, head of the Myocardial Bridge Research Center at Stanford, has appeared on BBC Radio to explain this.

== See also ==
- Cardiac CT
- Angiography
