= Embolus =

Unattached mass that travels through the bloodstream

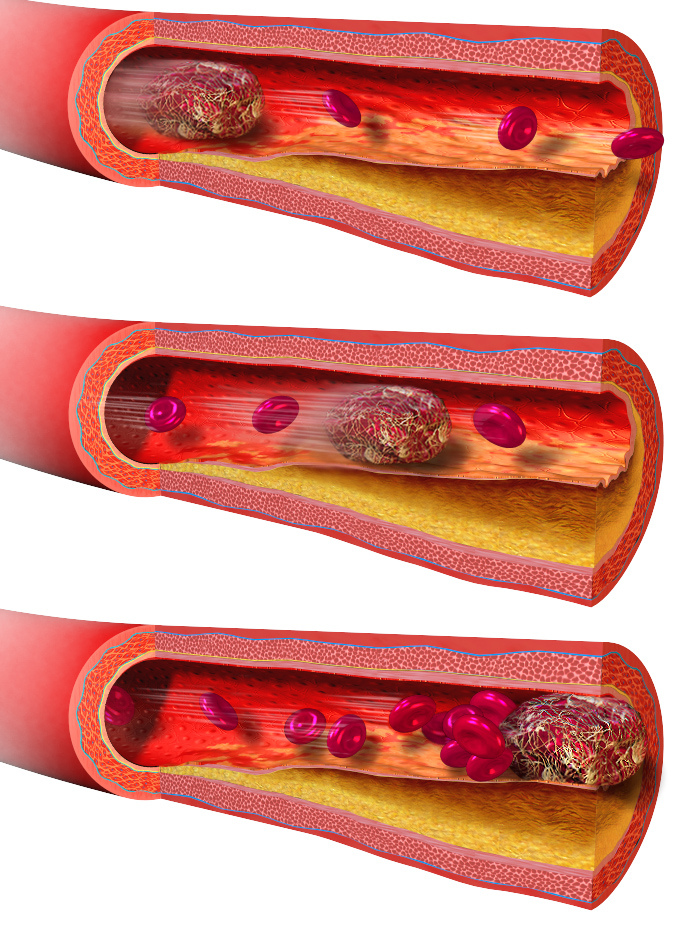
Illustration depicting an embolism within the bloodstream, and lodging at a site of vascular narrowing due to plaque

An embolus (/ˈɛmbələs/; pl.: emboli; from the Greek ἔμβολος "wedge", "plug") is an unattached mass that travels through the bloodstream and is capable of creating blockages. When an embolus occludes a blood vessel, it is called an embolism or embolic event. There are a number of different types of emboli, including blood clots, cholesterol plaque or crystals, fat globules, gas bubbles, and foreign bodies, which can result in different types of embolisms.

The term is distinct from embolism and thromboembolism, which may be consequences of an embolus, as discussed below.

The term was coined in 1848 by Rudolf Virchow as part of his foundational research into blood clots.

== Nomenclature ==
The term embolus refers generally to any free-floating mass in the bloodstream, or such a mass once lodged at a site of blockage. A related term is embolism, which describes the phenomenon of an embolus lodging in a vessel and creating a blockage. An embolism is technically a consequence of an embolus, but the terms are sometimes used interchangeably. Emboli and embolisms can be named according to their composition (such as air embolism) or the site where they lodge (pulmonary embolism).

In contrast to emboli, which can cause occlusion at sites distant from their points of origin, there are also non-traveling blockages that develop locally from vascular trauma and inflammation or other epithelial pathology, such as atheromata and thrombi. If these local blockages dislodge into circulation, they become emboli and if not broken down during circulation, may cause embolism(s). For example, a thromboembolism is the result of a thrombus that has broken off the interior of a blood vessel and caused a vessel blockage elsewhere in the circulation.

Details of embolism classification are discussed below.

== Classification by substance ==
The physical composition of the embolic material is the defining feature for classification, and this composition reflects the underlying pathophysiologic mechanism of the embolus' formation. Furthermore, different types of emboli result in different types of embolisms, each with distinct clinical characteristics.

By contrast, embolism is typically classified by the location where the emboli lands, such as in pulmonary embolism.

thromboembolism, the thrombus (blood clot) from a blood vessel is completely or partially detached from the site of thrombosis (clot). The blood flow will then carry the embolus (via blood vessels) to various parts of the body where it can block the lumen (vessel cavity) and cause vessel obstruction or occlusion. The free-moving thrombus is called an embolus. A thrombus is always attached to the vessel wall and is never freely moving in the blood circulation. This is also the key difference for pathologists to determine the cause of a blood clot, either by thrombosis or by post-mortem blood clot. Vessel obstruction will then lead to different pathological issues such as blood stasis and ischemia. However, not only thromboembolism will cause the obstruction of blood flow in vessels, but also any kind of embolism is capable of causing the same problem.

Fat embolism usually occurs when endogenous (from sources within the organism) fat tissue escapes into the blood circulation. The usual cause of fat embolism is therefore the fracture of tubular bones (such as the femur), which will lead to the leakage of fat tissue within the bone marrow into ruptured vessels. There are also exogenous (from sources of external origin) causes such as intravenous injection of emulsions.

An air embolism, on the other hand, is usually always caused by exogenic factors. This can be the rupture of alveoli, and inhaled air can be leaked into the blood vessels. Other more-common causes include the puncture of the subclavian vein by accident or during operation where there is negative pressure. Air is then sucked into the veins by the negative pressure caused by thoracic expansion during the inhalation phase of respiration. Air embolism can also happen during intravenous therapy, when air is leaked into the system (however this iatrogenic error in modern medicine is extremely rare).

Gas embolism is a common concern for deep-sea divers because the gases in human blood (usually nitrogen and helium) can be easily dissolved at higher amounts during the descent into deep sea. However, when the diver ascends to the normal atmospheric pressure, the gases become insoluble, causing the formation of small bubbles in the blood. This is also known as decompression sickness or the bends. This phenomenon is explained by Henry's Law in physical chemistry.

Embolism by other materials is rare. Septic embolism happens when a purulent tissue (pus-containing tissue) is dislodged from its original focus. Tissue embolism is analogous to macro-scale cancer metastasis, which happens when cancer tissue infiltrates blood vessels, and small fragments of tumor are released into the blood stream. Foreign-body embolism happens when exogenous—and only exogenous—materials such as talc enter the blood stream and cause occlusion or obstruction of blood circulation. Bullet embolism occurs in approximately 0.3% cases of gunshot wounds. Amniotic-fluid embolism is a rare complication of childbirth.

== Clinical significance ==
Emboli are clinically significant for their capacity to cause embolisms, which are a major cause of morbidity and mortality. By themselves, emboli are pathologic and therefore indicate some underlying dysfunction.

It may be difficult in the clinical setting to differentiate a thrombotic event (i.e., a local clot at the site of symptoms) from an embolic event (i.e., local obstruction due to a free-floating mass that traveled through circulation from elsewhere in the body).

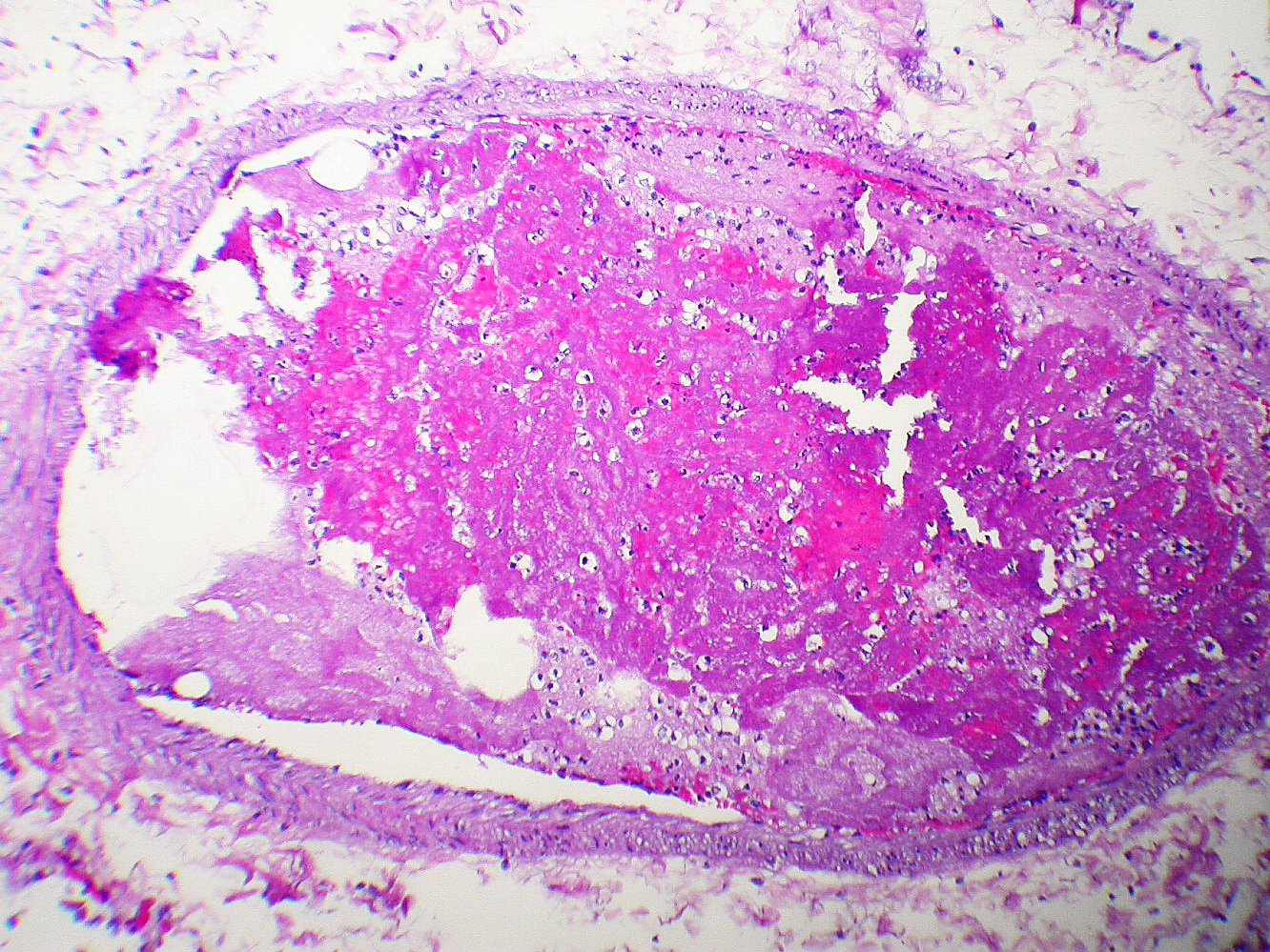
This pulmonary thromboembolism was the result of a thrombus (blood clot) detaching from the wall of a distant blood vessel. It then traveled through circulation until lodging in this pulmonary vessel, becoming a thromboembolism.

Septic emboli may also be a contributor to spreading infection through the bloodstream to other tissues.

== History ==
Rudolf Virchow, the German physician and "father of pathology", is generally credited with the first explanation of the relationship between thrombi, emboli, and embolisms. He coined the terms embolism (initially called "Embolia") and thrombosis while proposing a hypothesis for the pathophysiology of pulmonary thromboembolism.

In his work, he described the consequences of thrombosis and the factors leading thereto, a concept which today is known as Virchow's Triad. However, there is some dispute regarding certain aspects of this attribution.

== See also ==
- Paradoxical embolism
- Pulmonary embolism
- Virchow's Triad
