= CFR =

CFR may refer to:

== Biology ==
- 23S rRNA (adenine2503-C2,C8)-dimethyltransferase, an enzyme
- 23S rRNA (adenine2503-C2)-methyltransferase, an enzyme

== Organizations ==
- China Fire and Rescue, China's firefighting force
- Căile Ferate Române, the Romanian state railway
- Canadian Finals Rodeo
- Centre for Foreign Relations, Tanzania
- CFR Cluj, Romanian football club
- CFFR, a Canadian radio station once branded as "66 CFR"
- Chess Federation of Russia, the governing body for chess in Russia
- Council on Foreign Relations, U.S. foreign policy think tank
- Franciscan Friars of the Renewal, a religious institute in the Catholic Church commonly abbreviated as "CFR"

== Places ==
- Caen–Carpiquet Airport in northern France

== Protocols ==
- Charter of Fundamental Rights, a charter of political, social and economic rights for European Union (EU) citizens
- Code of Federal Regulations of the United States

== Titles ==
- Certified first responder
- Commander of the Order of the Federal Republic, Nigerian order of merit

== Other ==
- Case fatality rate, term for proportion of people dying of a disease
- The Common Frame of Reference drafted for the development of a European civil code of law
- Compact fusion reactor, a proposed nuclear fusion reactor project
- Contact flight rules, an obsolete aviation term superseded by visual flight rules
- Coronary flow reserve, a diagnostic cardiac measurement
- Cost and Freight, word used in international commerce
- Cross-functional requirements, another name for non-functional requirements or the "ilities" in software systems requirements and design
- Chinese Folk Religion, the millennia-old indigenous beliefs and folklore of China that later morphed into Taoism, Confucianism, and Chinese Buddhism
