= Cardiovascular disease in women =

Cardiovascular disease in women is an integral area of research in the ongoing studies of women's health. Cardiovascular disease (CVD) is an umbrella term for a wide range of diseases affecting the heart and blood vessels, including but not limited to, coronary artery disease, stroke, cardiomyopathy, myocardial infarctions, and aortic aneurysms.

Since the mid-1980s, CVD has been the leading cause of death in women, despite being presumed to be a primarily male disease. Two types of CVDs are shown to be the leading causes of death in women globally, according to the World Health Organization: ischemic heart disease and stroke. Although, on average, women will develop CVD 5-10 years later than men, the overall number of CVD diagnoses in men and women is similar.

Until recently, the gender-specific data available on cardiovascular disease (CVD) have been sparse for numerous reasons. The risks of CVD were unaccounted for in women due to gender biases, under-representation in clinical trials, and lack of research. These factors contributed to an increase in preventable deaths in women due to CVD. Thus, this is now an integral area of research in the ongoing studies of women's health.

Overall, these factors are instrumental in the key differences seen in CVD presentation, which must be accounted for in diagnostic and treatment practices by healthcare providers.

== Diagnostic gap ==
Cardiovascular disease in women may be misdiagnosed or underdiagnosed for several reasons. CVD, especially heart attacks, often presents symptoms in women differently than in men due to anatomical and hormonal differences. Research has shown that women may present with symptoms that are classically associated with heart attacks, such as chest pain and shortness of breath, but also with atypical symptoms such as neck, jaw, arm, or shoulder discomfort, nausea or vomiting, heartburn or indigestion, fatigue, headaches, and palpitations. Some healthcare providers may misidentify the causes of these symptoms, attributing them to gastrointestinal or psychological causes instead.

Moreover, although certain factors traditionally associated with developing CVD include age, high blood pressure (hypertension), smoking, diabetes mellitus, and abnormal amounts of cholesterol in the blood, and are similarly influential on women as on men, recent research has found additional risks that should be added to this list as non-traditional or emerging factors. These include pregnancy-associated disorders such as pre-eclampsia and gestational diabetes, polyendocrine metabolic ovarian syndrome (PMOS), and even depression. This discrepancy is furthered by the under-enrollment of women in research studies, establishing a CVD treatment baseline in women for healthcare practitioners.

Furthermore, the anatomical features of the cardiovascular system differ in size between men and women. The size of the vessels in women is generally smaller than in men. Thus, a smaller blockage can cause as much damage to women as a regular-sized blockage in men. Women also have a smaller ventricle size than men. This lowers the volume pumped out of the ventricle to the rest of the body, thus requiring a faster heartbeat faster to ensure a similar amount of blood is pumped out as men. These differences in addition to the cardiovascular functional differences, i.e. a slower fight or flight response, sympathetic activity, and a high rest and digest response, parasympathetic activity, may result in differing presentations of women's illnesses.

== Shifts and trends ==
According to a survey conducted by the AHA in 2000, women are now more aware of CVD as the leading cause of death in women than in 1997. Close to 90% of women are now aware that women experience heart disease symptoms gradually in later years and that the initial hours of treatment are critical to reducing damage to the brain and heart. This is further supported by a study done in Italy in 2022 that found a vast majority of their participants were able to successfully identify CVD as a leading cause of death in women.

However, many women are still unaware of the impact of CVD on women's health. This may be due to infrequent exposure to the concerns of a deficit of personalization in education to these groups, and little involvement of women in CVD research until 1986. Numerous studies have noted that many women were unable to identify common risk factors or acknowledge whether they were at possible risk of developing CVD, with quite a few even believing that CVD was a male-exclusive condition.

This lack of awareness appears to be prominent in women aged 25 to 34 years. Nearly 72% of women in this age group consider cancer to be the leading cause of death; however, as age increases, the understanding of heart disease has also been shown to increase. A national survey conducted by the AHA in 2012 suggested increased rates of awareness and consciousness. According to the fifteen-year trend report, some of the significant changes are as follows:

- In 2012, the level of awareness increased in women from different ethnicities, with percentages rising to 65% white, 36% black, and 34% Hispanic.
- In terms of knowledge of the symptoms of a heart attack, 18% of women responded with nausea, while 56% responded with chest pain.
- In case of experiencing a heart attack, 10% of Hispanic women were reported to initially take aspirin, compared to 22% of black and 18% of white women.
- The top 3 health management issues were reported to be exercise (by 49% of women), weight (by 47%), and cholesterol (by 45%).
- Analysis of data suggests further improvement in the educational efforts and awareness among women, especially of racial and ethnic minorities, as they face higher mortality rates.

As a follow-up, a recent 2019 AHA survey of the awareness of CVD being the leading cause of death in women has shown a decline in the last decade. The greatest differences were seen among Hispanic women, non-Hispanic Black women and the age group of 25 to 34 year old. These trends are similar to those found in the 2012 survey done by the American Heart Association. This shift in knowledge demonstrates a need for cardiovascular health programs targeted to women to ensure that they can successfully access the needed resources to ensure successful CVD treatment and prevention.

Moreover, trends have also demonstrated a difference in CVD risk and treatment amongst women from different ethnicities. In the 1980s, African American women had double the mortality rates compared to other women between the ages of 30 and 39. Although this number has improved, in comparison to white women, the disparity persists. A 2007 study that black and Hispanic women were nearly half as aware (31% and 29% respectively) than their white counterparts (68%). This is alarming as minority groups are at an increased risk of higher cholesterol levels and many other risk factors that cause CVD. Studies have found this may be due to lack of educational intervention being targeted to these groups to ensure equity access to health resources.

Future research is working to establish gender-specific guidelines and ensure that treatments, diagnoses, and overall practices are adjusted to encompass the differences of women with CVD in clinical application.

== Signs and symptoms ==
CVD is the leading cause of death in women worldwide. Studies have shown a recent successful decline in CVD mortality overall. However, there is a strong indication for male-specific reductions being implemented in practice; thus, female mortality remains high, despite the incidence of CVD being lower. The number of women surviving and dying from CVD far outweighs the number of men in comparison.

Due to anatomical and biological differences, women with CVD have been shown to present with the expected symptoms, as well as unusual and unexpected symptoms of CVD in comparison to men. The traditional, or common, symptoms seen in both men and women include:

1. Chest pain or feeling of crushing pain in the chest
2. Radiating pain in the arms or shoulder
3. Heartburn

However, some studies have shown that chest pain is not as common a symptom in women. Thus, its absence cannot rule out the likeliness of CVD.

For the atypical symptoms, numerous symptoms are often vague and seem unattached to specific diagnoses. Women generally develop angina and are less likely to present with myocardial infarction at the onset of cardiovascular diseases. The other symptoms to account for include:

1. Pain or discomfort in the neck, jaw, upper back, or abdomen
2. Shortness of breath
3. Nausea/vomiting
4. Sudden and random sweating
5. Fatigue
6. Lightheadedness or dizziness

Overall, these symptoms seem to be more present at rest than at any other time of day for women and at times of emotional distress. Women also tend to report milder symptoms, while also experiencing a combination of more symptoms than men.

To ensure that practitioners can detect all cases and forms presented to them, it is crucial to ensure that women's diagnostic tests are adjusted to include all these symptoms.

== Risk factors ==
Numerous risk factors are associated with developing CVD. A number of them are considered traditional, as they are found in men and women with CVD at high rates. However, there are also unique risk factors found only in women that are commonly associated with this group developing CVD. The following list includes the predominant ones found in many cases of CVD in women.

=== Smoking ===
Smoking has been well established as a risk factor for plaque formation, which can lead to developing different forms of CVD. Previous studies have shown that 4-5 cigarettes per day almost doubled the risk of CVD, and 20 cigarettes per day increased the risk of CVD by 6 times. Women who smoke face up to a 25% increased risk of developing CAD compared to their male counterparts, with studies showing that reduction in smoking decreased the incidence of CAD in women by 13%. Furthermore, second-hand smoking may increase the risk of CVD by 25%.

=== Obesity ===
Obesity is associated with several other factors that can increase the risk of CVD, such as dyslipidemias. With increasing body mass, the risk of developing various CVDs, such as ischemic stroke and coronary artery disease grows as the unhealthy lifestyle maintained prevents the cardiovascular system from functioning optimally. Women make up about 40% of obese adults over the age of 20. Postmenopausal women are also more likely to experience fat redistribution to the abdomen and develop metabolic syndrome, resulting in increased susceptibility to obesity.

=== Hypertension ===
Chronic high blood pressure (hypertension) alters the structure of vessels over time, such as narrowing or complete blockage of blood flow. This can subsequently lead to CVDs, including stroke. The prevalence of certain disorders, such as fibromuscular dysplasia, is increased in premenopausal women and can lead to secondary hypertension. These factors, including others such as preeclampsia, have been shown to contribute to the risk of developing hypertension, and thus, consequently, CVDs from the resulting damage. Women who have chronic hypertension have a much higher risk of developing cardiovascular disease compared to women with normal blood pressure.

=== Lipids ===
Cholesterol is a type of lipid with diverse bodily functions. There are several types of cholesterol, but the main two are high-density lipoprotein (HDL-C) and low-density lipoprotein (LDL-C). Then, the levels of these forms of cholesterol-carrying protein can be determined by a blood test. HDL cholesterol removes LDL-C from the bloodstream and returns it to the liver, where it can not cause cardiovascular damage.

Experts recommend having a low level of LDL cholesterol in the blood (130 mg/dL or less); anything higher can lead to a higher CVD risk. When there is a high level of LDL cholesterol in the blood, it is taken up by inflammatory cells known as macrophages. The high burden of LDL cholesterol in macrophages induces an inflammatory response. This inflammatory response ultimately damages the inner lining of the blood vessels (endothelial cells). With this damage, macrophages invade the blood vessel walls, causing atherosclerotic plaque formation. A plaque can lead to the obstruction of the blood vessel. If this were to occur in a coronary artery, it could increase the risk of a myocardial infarction (heart attack).

=== Diabetes mellitus ===
The high blood sugar levels associated with diabetes mellitus are also an important cardiovascular risk factor to consider. Data suggests that women with diabetes are at five times greater risk than those without for developing CVD. Uncontrolled levels of glucose can cause damage to the vessels and nerves alike, increasing the risk of developing other conditions, including CVD. Women with type I diabetes were found to be twice as likely to experience adverse cardiovascular events when compared to men with the same disease, but were less likely to receive aggressive treatment to control modifiable risk factors. Women with Type II diabetes are also at greater risk than men with the same condition, despite similar glycemic control.

=== Gestational diabetes mellitus ===
Similar to hypertensive disease of pregnancy, the already prevalent risk factor of diabetes mellitus combined with pregnancy puts women at increased risk of developing CVD. Women diagnosed with gestational diabetes are at a higher risk of developing traditional risk factors for CVD, such as type 2 diabetes mellitus and hypertension. The irreversible changes made during pregnancy may make these women prone to CVDs in the long term. Additionally, women diagnosed with gestational diabetes remain at higher risk of developing type 2 diabetes mellitus and CVD, despite blood sugar metabolism returning to normal post-pregnancy.

=== Preeclampsia ===
Hypertension can be severely damaging to vessels and the heart, and cause CVD to develop. Hypertensive disorders in pregnancy, such as pre-eclampsia, can be seen in 10% of pregnancies and has been recognized as a risk factor for developing new-onset hypertension after pregnancy.

=== Other pregnancy-associated conditions ===
Pregnancy offers numerous vascular and metabolic changes that, although they may seem temporary, result in long-term effects on the cardiovascular system. Women who deliver before 37 weeks of gestation are at increased risk of developing CVD, with additional risk depending on the number and timing of preterm births. Data suggests that women with a history of preterm births have two times the risk of CVD-related deaths than women with regular-term births. This may be due to the complications associated with preterm birth and its effect on the mothers. Additionally, intrauterine growth restriction (IUGR), which affects up to 10% of all births, in prior pregnancies is associated with an increase in maternal CVD risk for both the mother and the baby. Finally, prior pregnancy loss, including miscarriage and stillbirth, also contributed to a two-fold increase in risk of maternal CVD. Women who have high blood pressure and had complications in their pregnancy have three times the risk of developing cardiovascular disease compared to women with normal blood pressure who had no complications in pregnancy.

=== Menopause ===
Estrogen has several cardioprotective effects on women; thus, during the age of fertility – i.e., puberty to menopause – females are at a lower risk of developing CVD. However, menopause is associated with a decrease in estrogen production. This allows for typical cardiovascular issues to take their effects with little protection from the women's bodies. In rare cases, early menopause is correlated with increased CVD risk, although the relationship between the two is complex. Premature menopause is defined as menopause before the age of 40. Although the relationship between the two is complex, it seems to be due to the prevalence of atherosclerosis in perimenopause.

=== Physical activity ===
Lower levels of fitness are commonly associated with blockages and obstructed blood flow found in CVDs. As exercise promotes the use of the heart and improves oxygen affinity for muscles, this can help relieve stress from the heart and allow for it to pump at a normal pace while providing more nutrients and oxygen to the body. An observational study found that those with limited physical activity in their day were at 4.7 times increased risk for stroke and other forms of CVD.

=== Ethnicity and race ===
The prevalence of CVD has been shown to vary greatly among different ethnic and racial groups. Overall, ethnic minority women exhibit greater risk factors for CVD than white women. Black women are at the highest rate of CVD-related death. The cause for these gaps is still unclear, however, this may be related to genetics, socioeconomic status, education status, or inequitable health resources access.

=== Socioeconomic status ===
Lower socioeconomic status is largely associated with an increased risk of CVD development. This may be due to a combination of psychosocial risk factors affecting those in these groups. Additionally, inequitable access to much-needed resources to identify and treat these conditions may lead to delayed diagnosis and an inability to treat appropriately.

=== Age ===
The risk of CVD development increases as women age. During the fertility age of a woman, the high levels of estrogen provide cardioprotective effects. This, however, curbs significantly after menopause and increases the prevalence of CVD found in women. Research has found that for women 75 years old and higher, the incidence of CVD is significantly higher than for men.

=== Autoimmune diseases ===
About 13% of women are affected by one or more autoimmune diseases, which is about twice as many as men (7%). Particularly conditions like Graves' disease, Hashimoto's thyroiditis, primary biliary cholangitis, Sjögren's, systemic lupus erythematosus (SLE) or systemic sclerosis are 3-6 times more common in men than women. Some populations of women are also more likely to be affected than others. For example, SLE is two to four times more prevalent in black women when compared to white women. People with autoimmune diseases also have considerably higher risks of developing cardiovascular diseases, particularly those who develop an autoimmune disease at a young age. Studies have also shown that women with SLE are at least nine times more likely to experience a myocardial infarction when compared to the general population, with some estimates showing a 50-fold increase in risk. Similarly, RA increases the risk of death from CVD by 50%. In autoimmune diseases, the immune system reacts to the individual's antigens itself, which can cause local or systemic issues. This is furthered by the microvasculature in women that puts women at increased risk of developing autoimmune diseases themselves.

=== Polyendocrine metabolic ovarian syndrome (PMOS) ===
Polyendocrine metabolic ovarian syndrome (PMOS) is an endocrine disorder prevalent in young women that is classically associated with irregular menstruation, androgen excess, and infertility. It is unclear whether PMOS is associated with an increased risk of developing CVD. However, PMOS is associated with multiple traditional risk factors of CVD such as diabetes, obesity, dyslipidemia, and hypertension, which may naturally put the individual at increased risk of developing CVD.

=== Depression ===
Due to biological and sociological causes, women are twice as likely to have depression when compared to men. Studies have shown that women with depression are at greater risk of developing CVD when compared to peers without depression, although this relationship is still unclear. Moreover, depression has also been associated with smoking, a traditional risk factor for CVD.

=== Breast cancer treatment ===
Because of the location of the heart relative to the breasts, breast cancer treatments have been shown to cause an increased risk, acute or chronic, of CVD. Exposure to radiation and chemotherapy in cancer treatments have shown to cause complications in the heart and its blood vessels, causing scarring or stiffening of heart tissue, which is detrimental to the heart's function.

=== Hormones ===
Estrogen and other associated female sex hormones have been shown to have major cardioprotective effects on women. This may be why it is less common to see women with CVD before menopause, after which estrogen levels decline rapidly. This causal relationship is yet to be established, as unfortunately, hormone replacement therapies have not been successful in controlling this effect and may reflect a larger feedback loop in play to protect females of reproductive age from CVD.

== Diagnosis ==
CVD is an umbrella term encompassing numerous cardiovascular system conditions. These can be chronic (i.e., ongoing issues) or acute (i.e., having a sudden onset). In women, the most common cardiovascular diseases are: atrial fibrillation or flutter, heart failure, chronic ischaemic heart disease, and venous thromboembolism.

=== Arrhythmia ===
Arrhythmia (also known as cardiac or heart arrhythmias, or dysrhythmias) is an irregular heartbeat. The heartbeat is the rate at which the heart beats: too slow (bradycardia) or fast (tachycardia). Although it is normal for the heartbeat to fluctuate at times of activity or rest, chronic, consistent irregularity may cause not enough blood to reach all parts of the body, as well as put the individual at an increased risk of blood clotting. This can lead to other forms of CVD that may be life-threatening, such as a stroke, if the blood clot travels to the brain. Since women typically have faster normal heart rates and receive different electrocardiogram results than men, practitioners must approach these cases differently from men to make a rapid diagnosis.

=== Coronary artery disease ===
Coronary artery disease (also known as coronary heart disease or ischemic heart disease) results from the buildup of substances in the walls of the vessels that provide blood to the heart and parts of the body, the coronary arteries. These substances, which can include cholesterol, cause the vessels to narrow, preventing blood from flowing smoothly through. As the heart compensates for this decrease in blood going out by pumping harder, this can lead to muscle weakness over time, subsequently leading to other life-threatening forms of CVD. The unusual symptoms seen in women with this condition include a sensation of crushing pressure and fatigue, and feeling low on energy.

=== Congestive heart failure ===
Congestive heart failure (CHF) is when the heart muscle is unable to pump blood efficiently or at its normal capacity, preventing it from meeting our body's needs. This can cause fluid build-up in various organs, including the lungs and the heart itself, which also makes it life-threatening. Women and men tend to present similarly for CHF, although women frequently report having more of the symptoms, such as shortness of breath. As well, women typically reflect a normal level of amount of blood pumped from the heart, known as the ejection fraction, which makes diagnosis difficult as it is a crucial sign used to identify CHF.

=== Myocardial infarction ===
Heart attack/Myocardial infarction is when the blood flow to parts of the heart is blocked, due to various reasons, including plaque build-up, which can cause the heart muscle to die from not being used. This can lead to permanent heart damage, and may even result in death if not treated efficiently. Women can present with different symptoms than men, including jaw pain and nausea/vomiting; thus, it is important to be alert for unusual symptoms reported by women.

=== Peripheral arterial disease ===
Peripheral arterial disease: narrowing of the arteries that provide blood to the extremities due to plaque build-up. The lack of oxygen and nutrients can lead to tissue death and subsequent loss of the affected extremities. For this disease, women may or may not show signs, i.e., presenting asymptomatically, which can be a challenge in diagnosing.

=== Stroke ===
Stroke results from limiting or blocking the blood supply to a part of the brain, preventing the tissues from receiving the necessary oxygen and nutrients to continue functioning. This blockage can occur through a blood clot cutting off circulation through an artery (ischemic stroke) or a blood vessel leaking into the brain (hemorrhagic stroke).

=== Valvular heart disease ===
Valvular heart disease is any CVD caused by the valves, the doors between the chambers of the heart: aortic, mitral, tricuspid, or pulmonary valve. These can be seen as either valve narrowing, also known as stenosis, or regurgitation, incomplete closing of the valves, which leads to leaking of blood backward through the chambers of the heart. Of these, mitral regurgitation followed by aortic stenosis are the most common forms found in women.

=== Diagnostic tests ===
Various tests are used to diagnose CVDs. These include scans, imaging, blood work, and other laboratory tests. Here are the most frequently used diagnostic tests:

- Electrocardiogram (ECG or EKG): An ECG OR EKG monitors the wave representing the activity of the heart. Any discrepancies or changes in the typical patterns indicate a cardiac condition, such as CVD, affecting the individual.
- Echocardiogram An echo provides an outline of the heart's function to help assess how well it is operating. This is often combined with a Doppler ultrasound to help track the blood flowing through the heart's chambers and valves.
- Holter monitor: The Holter monitor is a portable device worn for a few days to monitor the heart's rhythm and any changes seen throughout the day. This allows for a more in-depth understanding of how well the heart is functioning and whether any irregular patterns are common or infrequent.
- Cardiac magnetic resonance imaging (MRI): A cardiac MRI is an imaging machine that uses waves to develop a clear picture of your cardiovascular. It allows for a 3D image of the heart to be produced to allow for more thorough investigations of any issues.
- Exercise stress test: This is a physical activity test for healthcare providers to see how an individual's heart functions during physical stress. The results from this test can demonstrate how to guide treatments for different conditions and even the efficacy of the current treatment in affected individuals.
- Nuclear stress test: A nuclear stress test involves a trace amount of a radioactive substance put into your blood and is followed as it flows through the heart. The imaging machine uses this as a guide to create a picture of the heart and the flow. By following the flow of the substance, healthcare providers can better understand where the impairment is and in what form.
- Cardiac catheterization and angiogram: In this procedure, a thin tube is inserted and threaded into the heart's chambers. This catheter allows various instruments to be inserted through it to measure blood pressure, collect blood samples, or remove a sample of the heart's tissue for further testing.
- Cardiac computerized tomography (CT) scan: This cardiac CT scan is an X-ray imaging machine that shows the blood supply to the heart and its arteries. This form of testing offers a non-invasive method to assess for narrowed or blocked vessels.

== Prevention ==
Depending on the risks associated with age, disease type, prognosis, pregnancy, or menopausal stage, the following primary preventions can be prescribed to women under the guidance and proper consultation with their healthcare provider.

Nutrition and exercise: Adjusting an individual's lifestyle through diet choices and increased physical activity has been shown to reduce the long-term negatives associated with most risk factors, including plaque buildup and weakening of the heart muscle. Exercise has been shown to strengthen the heart muscle, allowing it to pump greater blood volume at a regular pace, thus preventing overexertion and tissue damage. Additionally, a diet with low trans fat, saturated fat, refined carbohydrates, and sugar-sweetened beverages, and enriched with fruits, vegetables, whole grains, and unsaturated fats have reflected a significant reduction in the risk of developing.

Smoking cessation: The adverse effects associated with smoking have been overwhelmingly shown to contribute to numerous risk factors that cause CVDs. These include contributing to atherosclerosis and contributing to blood clot formation. For patients who have a history of smoking, it is important to focus on quitting smoking to prevent additional damage and allow healing to begin.

== Treatment ==
As CVD is the primary result of long-term damage to the cardiovascular system, research has been unable to develop a way to cure it permanently. However, through available therapies and prevention strategies, methods to improve its effects to preserve the individual's quality of life remain. This can help manage and reduce further risk of developing life-threatening CVDs. The strategies established in routine care include pharmacological therapies, lifestyle changes (including nutrition and exercise), surgery, and smoking cessation.

Pharmacological therapy: Various medications have been shown to mediate the negative symptoms of CVD. These typically work to lower the individual's blood pressure or widen their

- Angiotensin II receptor blockers (ARB) & Angiotensin-converting enzyme inhibitors (ACEI): Both types of drugs work to limit the effects of angiotensin II, which raises blood pressure through a feedback loop in the kidneys. They have shown to greatly reduce the mortality associated with CVDs, with ACEIs being more effective than ARBs.
- Aspirin: Aspirin, or ASA, promotes platelet function inhibition, which reduces the risk of plaque buildup in vessels. This has been shown to alleviate the effects of vessel narrowing and blood flow impairment and prevent numerous CVDs. The Women's Health Study in 2005 also found that Aspirin reduced the risk of developing stroke, as well as myocardial infarction in some age groups, in the long term.
- Beta-blockers: Beta-blockers impede the effects of adrenaline, also known as epinephrine, and subsequently slow the heart rate. This type of medication is generally prescribed for hypertension, a major risk factor for many CVDs. However, recent studies have shown that this medication may lead to a higher rate of heart failure in men; thus, these medications should be taken with caution.
- Blood thinners: Blood thinners prevent clot formation, which contributes to vessel blockage, and are an effective method of anticoagulation that naturally plays an important role in cardiovascular system conditions. Low dose blood thinners have shown to reduce the risk of developing stroke significantly, heart attacks and even the mortality associated with CVD.
- Calcium channel blockers: Calcium channel blockers are vasodilators, i.e., widen our arteries by regulating the calcium entering the cells, which lowers blood pressure. This is effective across all patient groups regardless of age and severity. This is even more effective in combination with other therapies and must be used in moderation to prevent chronic cell damage.
- Diuretics: Diuretics assist the kidneys in clearing extra fluid present in the body to help maintain a steady blood volume for the heart to pump around. This helps bring blood pressure down, relieving pressure on the vessels and, consequently, the heart, thus making it a successful treatment for hypertension.
- Hormone Replacement Therapy (HRT): HRT is taken by women to replace the declining estrogen levels during times of menopause. This is to control the cardio-protection offered by estrogen as women hit menopause and their levels decline.
- Nitroglycerin and Other Nitrogen Oxides: Nitroglycerin and other nitrogen oxide use have been a strong influence on vasodilation, cell permeability, inflammation, and various other cardiovascular processes.
- Statin therapy: This therapy aims to reduce levels of fat in the blood, specifically triglycerides and cholesterol. The proposed mechanisms for them are that they stabilize the plaque and reduce blood clots, which prevent most CVDs from developing. As primary prevention, they are significantly effective in patients at reducing the mortality and other life-threatening aspects of CVD.

Surgery: In severe cases of CVD, various forms of surgery offer a more permanent treatment to replace or remake the affected vasculature to prevent this from recurring.

- Coronary angioplasty: the insertion of a thin tube with a balloon on the end into the clogged artery, which becomes inflated to widen the channel for blood to pass through. In some cases, a stent is left to maintain the opening and prevent further narrowing of the artery.
- Coronary artery bypass graft: using another blood vessel to replace and divert blood around an occluded vessel to maintain regular blood flow of nutrients and oxygen, and prevent tissue death.
- Heart transplant: the replacement of an individual's heart that is affected by disease with one of a healthy donor.

== Epidemiology ==
CVD remains the most common cause of death for women, with approximately one-third of deaths worldwide attributed to CVD. In 2015, approximately 8.5 million women died from the disease.

In the United States, approximately 47.8 million women over the age of 20 were diagnosed with CVD between 2011 and 2014, and data from 2015 shows over 400,000 deaths due to CVD in women. While overall deaths from CVD are falling, the decline is slower in women, particular black women. The death rate for women with CVD surpasses that of men from CVD. In Europe, over half of the deaths in women are attributed to CVD. The death rate in some Eastern European countries is high, with over 500 deaths per 100,000 population attributed to CVD. Studies predict that in certain developing countries in Asia and Africa, women will account for a greater percentage of deaths related to CVD by 2040.

Cardiovascular disease is more prevalent in older populations. On average, women develop CVD approximately 5 to 10 years after their male counterparts. In the United States, approximately 6% of women over 20 have coronary heart disease. The highest prevalence of CVD is present in adults over the age of 80, and women and men have similar rates of disease after the age of 60.

== History ==
In the last few decades, the greatest changes have been made to acknowledge and focus on sex as an influential factor, thus establishing a great need to incorporate women into research. The events of significance are as follows:

- In 1994, the United Nations stated that to establish a policy, there must be more sex-specific research done regarding treatment efficacy, thus encouraging researchers to pursue this line of inquiry.
- The Food and Drug Administration (FDA) of the United States established their Office of Women's Health around this time, in 1991, concentrating on the underrepresentation of women in research, especially with CVD.
- In 1993, the FDA created a guide for researchers to follow when including women in their studies, with an updated action plan for this published in 2014. The 1993 policy effectively reversed one established in 1977 that called on fertile women to be excluded from clinical trials, which had furthered the lack of women present in research at the time. This was done to address concerns of birth defects among infants and changes in estrogen and progesterone in postmenopausal women. Between 1988 and 1991, only 50% of data analysis from trials that were not designed for women accounted for the gender difference. It was assumed that the drugs given to men would work if prescribed to women.
- The Institute of Medicine, also from the United States, moved forward with other milestones by publishing papers in 2001 and 2010 that recognized sex and gender for the first time as variables crucial in women's health.
- Also in 2010, the Canadian Institutes of Health Research and the Canadian Institute of Gender and Health produced a tool to make incorporating sex and gender as variables easier in research.
- This was followed shortly by the World Health Organization, which in 2014, promoted more gender-specific approaches to data analysis and health-inequality monitoring to ensure that a more sustainable approach was taken to this research.
- In 2015, the National Institutes of Health and the United Nations both endorsed the necessity for gender-specific reporting or providing a reason for why it was not included in studies to ensure that researchers are held accountable. The United Nations specifically advocated for gender-sensitive strategies to be established by 2030.
- Following in North America's footsteps, the League of European Research Universities proposed a list of suggestions for how to undertake gender-specific research for universities, governments, and more.
- In 2016, two vital reports from Oxford and the United Nations, "Women's Health: a new global agenda" and "Global Strategy for Women's, Children's, and Adolescents' Health (2016–2030)", were published, bringing much-needed attention to this issue.
- The European Commission in 2016 provided a published guide for Horizon 2020 to address participation gaps for women in research and strategies to approach this.

These are not the only steps taken to include women in the scientific community. Several policies and practices have already been established and continue to be added to address the growing concern of CVD.

- The Centers for Disease Control and Prevention division of heart disease and stroke prevention initiated the Well-Integrated Screening and Evaluation for WOMen Across the Nation (WISEWOMAN) awareness campaign in 1993. It was created to educate women on the risk factors associated with CVD and encourage healthier lifestyles to limit that risk.
- In 1996, the National Heart, Lung, and Blood Institute began the Women's Ischemia Syndrome Evaluation (WISE), an NIH-funded initiative chaired by C. Noel Bairey Merz, to investigate ischemic heart disease (IHD) in women.
- In 1999, the AHA created the Guide to Preventive Cardiology for Women guideline to be used by the scientific community. This was the first of its kind in advising CVD management in women.
- In 2004, the 1999 guideline was replaced by the Evidence-based guidelines for cardiovascular disease prevention in women by the American Heart Association. These guidelines underlined the importance of including women in research and challenged the notion that men and women are the same for CVD pathogenesis, and these differences should encourage research and treatment to be approached accordingly. There were additional updates to this in 2007 and 2011.
- The European Society of Cardiology and European Health Network in 2006 started the transnational project for the prevention and management of CVD, where its objective was to "Address the significant burden of CVD in Europe and to determine specific areas of intervention to contribute to preventing avoidable deaths and disability".
- The Hellenic Cardiac Society, a European organization, followed this up with a national action plan for CVD projected for 2008 to 2012. Its aim, through the American Heart Association and many other guidelines, was to prevent CVD, primarily heart disease and stroke.
- In 2011, the American House of Representatives put forward huge legislation called the "Heart Disease, Education, Analysis, Research, Treatment for Women Act or Heart for Women Act". This is intended to provide healthcare professionals and others with gender-specific information for appropriate medical treatments.
- Also in 2011, the European Society of Cardiology released guidelines for the management of cardiovascular diseases during pregnancy: the Task Force on the Management of Cardiovascular Diseases During Pregnancy of the European Society of Cardiology. As pregnancy is a crucial unique factor to consider in women, these guidelines encouraged the scientific community to be able to tailor treatment plans accordingly. There was one update to this made in 2018.
- The Journal of American College of Cardiology released a state-of-the-art review in 2017 called "Quality and equitable health care gaps for women: attributions to sex differences in cardiovascular medicine". This discussed the quality and equity of health care received by women.
- In that same year, the released survey results provided insight into the awareness within healthcare providers and the gaps present in the research and clinical applications thus far.

== Causes ==
Since there are a variety of CVDs and cardiovascular disease causes, there is no one specific mechanism that can cause CVD. However, there are general components known to promote CVD development pathways.

Reactive oxygen species (ROS): ROS are produced through numerous processes in our cells, including the induction of oxidative enzymes. The notable species involved in human cells include superoxide anion (O_{2}^{−}), hydroxyl radicals (OH), and hydrogen peroxide (H_{2}O_{2}). Not only does ROS physiologically have a role in controlling the vasculature through tone and endothelial and cardiac function, but it also is a vital player in inflammation, promoting apoptosis, angiogenesis and much more. Additionally, ROS causes oxidative stress within the body which, although may not be the sole proprietor, exacerbates the various factors that contribute to developing CVD, especially hypertension. Finally, ROS also act as signaling molecules to induce the body's inflammatory response to prevent any further damage from happening, which can lead to cell and tissue damage of the vasculature if not moderated appropriately.

Induction of oxidative enzymes: Cytosolic oxidases are another critical component in ROS production. These enzymes transfer electrons, creating radicals or superoxide, and increase oxidative stress. These enzymes have also shown to be present in various physiological stressful situations, which is associated with hypertension and other traditional risk factors negatively impacting CVD.

- Xanthine oxidase (XO): XO, under normal circumstances, is an important enzyme in producing uric acid, released from the kidneys. These are typically located in the liver, however under times of stress from ROS, can increase its activity. This elevates vascular tone and even ROS production in the form of superoxide, thus contributing to higher oxidative stress.
- Nitric oxide synthase: Nitric oxide synthases are known for producing nitric oxide, which has numerous functions in the body, including vasodilation – i.e., widening of the vessels. Nitric oxide reacts with other forms of ROS to create potent oxidants, consequently causing other pathologic conditions, including heart failure and myocardial infarction. Moreover, this family of enzymes are crucial signaling molecules in regulating vascular tone and multiple other functions. Thus, any disruption in regular functioning impacts the vascular tone regulation.
- NADH/NADPH oxidase: These enzymes contribute significantly to the amount of ROS present in the body. If in cardiac distress, an individual may induce excessive production, which may in turn lead to the pathogenesis of varying forms of tissue damage and cellular dysfunction in cardiac muscles.
- Female specific cardiac fibrosis pathways observed in rodent studies include the downregulation of the microRNA miRNA-26a.

Uncoupling of Mitochondrial electron transport chain: The mitochondria contribute to the levels of ROS we see within our body. Not only does it produce it, but it is also vulnerable to ROS-induced damage. It is also a key player of cell function in the cardiovascular system. With this damage to the mitochondria, the cell's function may be altered as not enough energy is being produced as needed, thus hindering the cell's ability to function optimally. These events create a disastrous feedback loop where further mitochondrial damage results in increased ROS production, which furthers the damage and contributes to the risk of developing CVD.

Immune cell infiltration and cytokines: A large contributing risk factor to the development of CVD is the production of plaque, also known as atherogenesis or atherosclerosis. This condition is known to involve multiple inflammatory cascades from the immune system responding to varying pathogens. Elevated inflammatory cytokines, including interleukin-6 and tumor necrosis factor-⍺, initiate a cascade conducive to plaque production.
