= C. Noel Bairey Merz =

American cardiologist

- Born: Cathleen Noel Bairey; Texas, United States
- Citizenship: American
- Education: University of Chicago (BA); Harvard Medical School (MD)
- Scientific career
- Fields: Cardiology, Women's Cardiovascular Health
- Workplaces: Cedars-Sinai Medical Center; UCLA School of Medicine

External videos
- "The single biggest health threat women face", C. Noel Bairey Merz, TEDx, 2011
- Improving CVD risk prediction in women, American College of Physicians Internal Medicine Meeting, April 29, 2022
- "Meet Noel Bairey Merz, MD", Cedars-Sinai, April 13, 2023

C. Noel Bairey Merz is a medical doctor who has studied differences in heart diseases between women and men. She is the director of the Barbra Streisand Women's Heart Center at the Cedars-Sinai Heart Institute of Cedars-Sinai Medical Center, where she holds the Women's Guild Endowed Chair in Women's Health.

Bairey Merz is a Fellow of the American College of Cardiology (FACC, 1989), the American Heart Association (FAHA, 1990), and the European Society of Cardiology (FESC, 2017), among others. For her pioneering work in identifying cardiovascular disease as an issue in women's health, she was awarded the 2023 Master of the ACC award by the American College of Cardiology (ACC).

== Early life and education ==
Cathleen Noel Bairey was born in Texas and grew up mostly in Modesto, California. In 1973, a year after the passage of Title IX, the University of Chicago drew national attention when it created the first full four-year academic-athletic scholarship for women. Bairey Merz received the inaugural Gertrude Dudley Scholarship, for swimming, enabling her to attend the university. She completed her bachelor's degree at the University of Chicago in 1977 followed by a medical degree from Harvard University in 1981.

At Harvard, Bairey met classmate Robert Merz, whom she married the day after graduation. The couple became residents at the University of California, San Francisco in 1981, where Bairey Merz served as Chief Medical Resident from 1984 to 1985. While at UCSF, she worked with AIDS patients, then a newly discovered and not-finally-named disease. In 1985, Bairey Merz joined the Department of Cardiology of Cedars-Sinai Medical Center in Los Angeles, California where she completed fellowships in clinical and nuclear cardiology.

== Career ==
Since 1990, Bairey Merz has taught and done research at the UCLA School of Medicine and at the Cedars-Sinai Medical Center, where she holds multiple titles. Beginning in 1996, Bairey Merz chaired the National Institutes of Health's WISE initiative (Women's Ischemic Syndrome Evaluation) to study the diagnosis and evaluation of coronary artery disease in women. In 2001, she became director of the Women's Heart Center at Cedars-Sinai. Her students include Odayme Quesada, who established a Women's Heart Center at The Christ Hospital in 2020.

Bairey Merz specializes in gender-related differences in the biology and physiology of heart disease, and is credited with inspiring work in this field. Heart disease is now known to be the leading cause of death in women. Although more women die from cardiovascular disease than men, the symptoms associated with the "Hollywood heart attack" are common to men. As a result of the work of Bairey Merz and others such as Bernadine Healy, the American Heart Association now distinguishes between coronary heart disease, the pattern common in male heart patients, and coronary microvascular disease, which more often affects women. Coronary microvascular disease narrows smaller arteries in the heart, causing symptoms such as extreme fatigue, indigestion, and jaw or back pain, which are often ignored by both patients and clinicians. Bairey Merz has been a major voice in increasing awareness of the need to correctly diagnose and treat this disease.

Bairey Merz' research on hypertension in young women suggests that blood pressure starts to rise earlier in life for women and also advances faster in women. At the same age, a woman with hypertension may be more likely to develop cardiovascular problems than a man. Women are encouraged to monitor their blood pressure regularly, self-advocate with doctors, and take preventive steps by managing stress and weight, exercising regularly, avoiding alcohol, and eating fruits and vegetables.

== Awards and honors ==
- 1989, Fellow of the American College of Cardiology (FACC)
- 1990, Fellow of the American Heart Association (FAHA)
- 2005, Red Dress Award for Leadership in Cardiovascular Research in Women, Woman's Day magazine, with Nieca Goldberg
- 2006, Alvin P. Shapiro Award, Society for Biopsychosocial Science and Medicine
- 2008, inaugural Dr. Carolyn McCue Woman Cardiologist of the Year
- 2012, Distinguished Scientist awardee, American College of Cardiology (ACC)
- 2013, Fellow, International Academy of Cardiovascular Sciences (IACS)
- 2014, Alumni Professional Achievement Award, UChicago Alumni Association
- 2016, Bernadine Healy Leadership in Women's Cardiovascular Disease Award, American College of Cardiology
- 2017, Fellow of the European Society of Cardiology (FESC)
- 2020, Pioneer in Medicine award, Cedars-Sinai
- 2023 Master of the ACC award by the American College of Cardiology (ACC)

== Selected publications ==
- Merz, CN; Kelsey, SF; Pepine, CJ; Reichek, N; Reis, SE; Rogers, WJ; Sharaf, BL; Sopko, G (May 1999). "The Women's Ischemia Syndrome Evaluation (WISE) study: protocol design, methodology and feasibility report". Journal of the American College of Cardiology. 33 (6): 1453–61. doi:10.1016/s0735-1097(99)00082-0. PMID 10334408.
- Nugent, L; Mehta, PK; Bairey Merz, CN (January 2011). "Gender and microvascular angina". Journal of Thrombosis and Thrombolysis. 31 (1): 37–46. doi:10.1007/s11239-010-0477-1. PMC 3768268. PMID 20419338.
- Merz, CN (June 2011). "The Yentl syndrome is alive and well". European Heart Journal. 32 (11): 1313–5. doi:10.1093/eurheartj/ehr083. PMID 21393339.
- Benjamin, EJ; Blaha, MJ; Chiuve, SE; Cushman, M; Das, SR; Deo, R; de Ferranti, SD; Floyd, J; Fornage, M; Gillespie, C; Isasi, CR; Jiménez, MC; Jordan, LC; Judd, SE; Lackland, D; Lichtman, JH; Lisabeth, L; Liu, S; Longenecker, CT; Mackey, RH; Matsushita, K; Mozaffarian, D; Mussolino, ME; Nasir, K; Neumar, RW; Palaniappan, L; Pandey, DK; Thiagarajan, RR; Reeves, MJ; Ritchey, M; Rodriguez, CJ; Roth, GA; Rosamond, WD; Sasson, C; Towfighi, A; Tsao, CW; Turner, MB; Virani, SS; Voeks, JH; Willey, JZ; Wilkins, JT; Wu, JH; Alger, HM; Wong, SS; Muntner, P; American Heart Association Statistics Committee and Stroke Statistics, Subcommittee (7 March 2017). "Heart Disease and Stroke Statistics-2017 Update: A Report From the American Heart Association". Circulation. 135 (10): e146–e603. doi:10.1161/CIR.0000000000000485. PMC 5408160. PMID 28122885.
- Shaw, LJ; Pepine, CJ; Xie, J; Mehta, PK; Morris, AA; Dickert, NW; Ferdinand, KC; Gulati, M; Reynolds, H; Hayes, SN; Itchhaporia, D; Mieres, JH; Ofili, E; Wenger, NK; Bairey Merz, CN (18 July 2017). "Quality and Equitable Health Care Gaps for Women: Attributions to Sex Differences in Cardiovascular Medicine". Journal of the American College of Cardiology. 70 (3): 373–388. doi:10.1016/j.jacc.2017.05.051. PMID 28705320.
- Bairey Merz, CN; Andersen, H; Sprague, E; Burns, A; Keida, M; Walsh, MN; Greenberger, P; Campbell, S; Pollin, I; McCullough, C; Brown, N; Jenkins, M; Redberg, R; Johnson, P; Robinson, B (11 July 2017). "Knowledge, Attitudes, and Beliefs Regarding Cardiovascular Disease in Women: The Women's Heart Alliance". Journal of the American College of Cardiology. 70 (2): 123–132. doi:10.1016/j.jacc.2017.05.024. PMID 28648386.
- Barsky, L; Merz, CNB; Wei, J; Shufelt, C; Handberg, E; Pepine, C; Rutledge, T; Reis, S; Doyle, M; Rogers, W; Shaw, L; Sopko, G (18 June 2020). "Even "WISE-R?"-an Update on the NHLBI-Sponsored Women's Ischemia Syndrome Evaluation". Current Atherosclerosis Reports. 22 (8): 35. doi:10.1007/s11883-020-00852-w. PMC 7388776. PMID 32556630.
- Vogel, B; Acevedo, M; Appelman, Y; Bairey Merz, CN; Chieffo, A; Figtree, GA; Guerrero, M; Kunadian, V; Lam, CSP; Maas, AHEM; Mihailidou, AS; Olszanecka, A; Poole, JE; Saldarriaga, C; Saw, J; Zühlke, L; Mehran, R (19 June 2021). "The Lancet women and cardiovascular disease Commission: reducing the global burden by 2030". Lancet. 397 (10292): 2385–2438. doi:10.1016/S0140-6736(21)00684-X. PMID 34010613.
