= Anxiety =

Unpleasant emotion

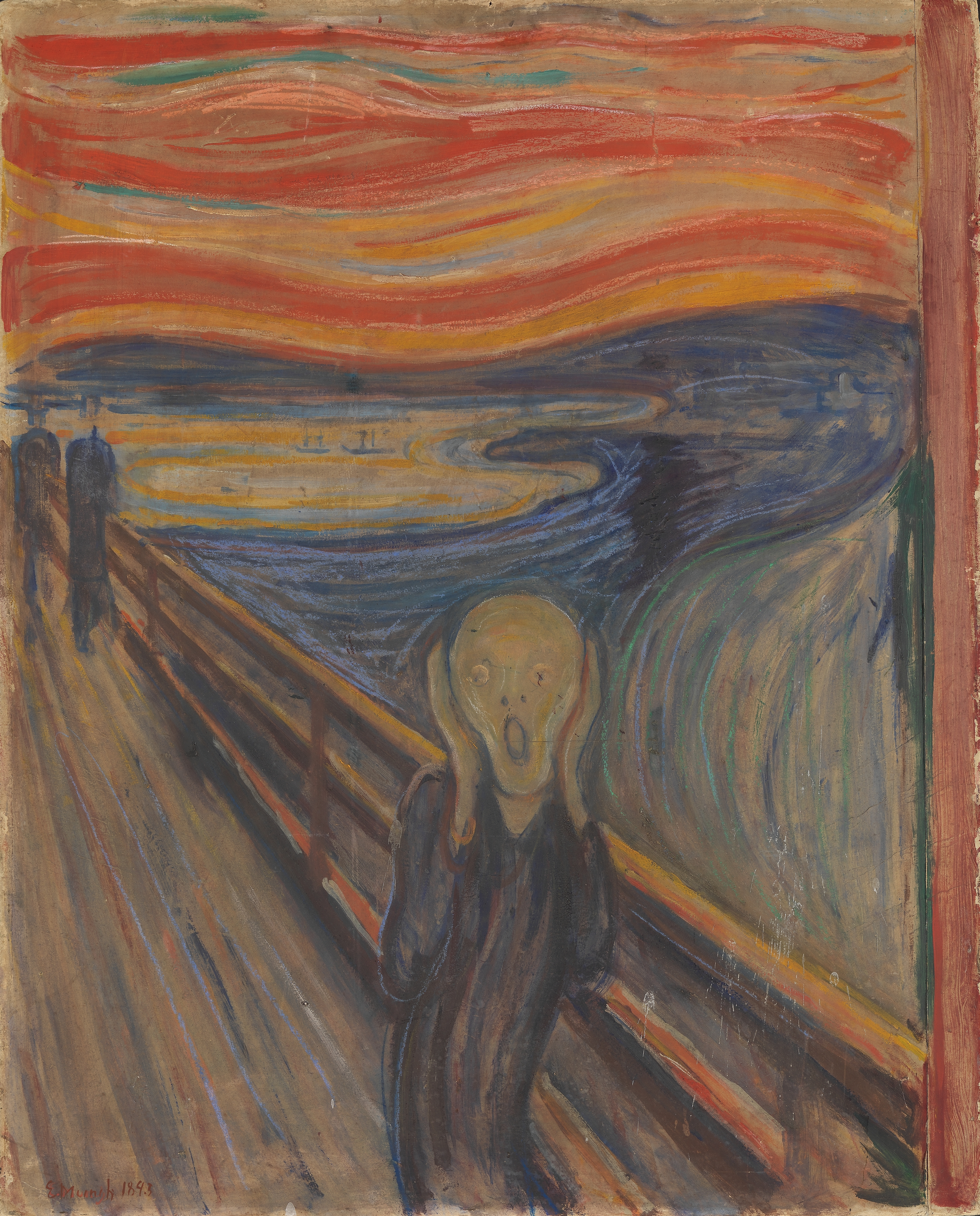
Anxiety underlies The Scream (1893) by Edvard Munch, which grapples with a complex human experience.

Anxiety is an emotion characterized by an unpleasant state of inner turmoil and includes feelings of dread over anticipated events. Anxiety is different from fear in that fear is defined as the emotional response to a present threat, whereas anxiety is the anticipation of a future one. It is often accompanied by nervous behavior such as pacing back and forth, somatic complaints, and rumination.

Anxiety is a feeling of uneasiness and worry, usually generalized and unfocused as an overreaction to a situation that is only subjectively seen as menacing. It is often accompanied by muscular tension, restlessness, fatigue, inability to catch one's breath, tightness in the abdominal region, nausea, and problems in concentration. Anxiety is closely related to fear, which is a response to a real or perceived immediate threat (fight-or-flight response); anxiety involves the expectation of a future threat, including dread. People facing anxiety may withdraw from situations which have provoked anxiety in the past.

There are multiple anxiety disorders, including generalized anxiety disorder and panic disorder. The difference between an anxiety disorder and anxiety (as a normal emotion) is that people with an anxiety disorder experience anxiety excessively or persistently for approximately 6 months, or even during shorter time periods in children. Anxiety disorders are among the most persistent mental problems and often last decades. Anxiety can also be experienced within other mental disorders (e.g., obsessive–compulsive disorder, post-traumatic stress disorder).

== Anxiety vs. fear ==
Anxiety is distinguished from fear, which is an appropriate cognitive and emotional response to a perceived threat. Fear is related to the specific behaviors of fight-or-flight responses, defensive behavior or escape. There is a false presumption that often circulates that anxiety only occurs in situations perceived as uncontrollable or unavoidable, but this is not always so. David Barlow defines anxiety as "a future-oriented mood state in which one is not ready or prepared to attempt to cope with upcoming negative events," and that it is a distinction between future and present dangers which divides anxiety and fear. Another description of anxiety is agony, dread, terror, or even apprehension. In positive psychology, anxiety is described as the mental state that results from a difficult challenge for which the subject has insufficient coping skills.

Fear and anxiety can be differentiated into four domains: (1) duration of emotional experience, (2) temporal focus, (3) specificity of the threat, and (4) motivated direction. Fear is short-lived, present-focused, geared towards a specific threat, and facilitates escape from threat. On the other hand, anxiety is long-acting, future-focused, broadly focused towards a diffuse threat, and promotes excessive caution while approaching a potential threat and interferes with constructive coping.

Joseph E. LeDoux and Lisa Feldman Barrett have both sought to separate automatic threat responses from additional associated cognitive activity within anxiety.

== Evolutionary perspectives ==
Evolutionary psychiatry and evolutionary psychology interpret anxiety as an evolved defenses that helps organisms avoid potential threats; by design, such defenses can produce "false alarms" when the cost of a missed danger would be high (sometimes described as a "smoke‑detector" principle). Contemporary reviews stress that this framing does not treat anxiety disorders as adaptive, but rather as dysregulations or context‑insensitive activation of otherwise useful systems; the perspective is used for explanation and psychoeducation, not as a specific therapy.

== Symptoms ==
Anxiety can be experienced with long, drawn-out daily symptoms that reduce quality of life, known as chronic (or generalized) anxiety, or it can be experienced in short spurts with sporadic, stressful panic attacks, known as acute anxiety. Symptoms of anxiety can range in number, intensity, and frequency, depending on the person. However, most people do not suffer from chronic anxiety.

Anxiety can induce several psychological pains (e.g., depression) or mental disorders, and may lead to self-harm or suicide.

The behavioral effects of anxiety may include withdrawal from situations which have provoked anxiety or negative feelings in the past. Other effects may include changes in sleeping patterns, changes in habits, an increase or decrease in food intake, and increased motor tension (such as foot tapping).

The emotional effects of anxiety may include feelings of apprehension or dread, lightheadedness, shakiness, trouble concentrating, feeling tense or jumpy, anticipating the worst, irritability, restlessness, watching for signs of danger, and a feeling of emptiness. It may also include a feeling of helplessness.

The cognitive effects of anxiety may include thoughts about suspected dangers, such as an irrational fear of dying or having a heart attack, when in reality, all one is experiencing is mild chest pain, for example.

The physiological symptoms of anxiety may include:

- Neurological, as headache, paresthesia, fasciculations, vertigo, or presyncope.
- Digestive, as abdominal pain, nausea, diarrhea, indigestion, dry mouth, or globus. Stress hormones released in an anxious state have an impact on bowel function and can manifest physical symptoms that may contribute to or exacerbate IBS.
- Respiratory, as shortness of breath or sighing breathing.
- Cardiac, as palpitations, tachycardia, or chest pain.
- Muscular, as fatigue, tremors, or tetany.
- Cutaneous, as perspiration, or itchy skin.
- Uros-genital, as frequent urination, urinary urgency, dyspareunia, or impotence, chronic pelvic pain syndrome.

== Types ==
There are various types of anxiety. Existential anxiety can occur when a person faces angst, an existential crisis, or nihilistic feelings. People can also face mathematical anxiety, somatic anxiety, stage fright, or test anxiety. Social anxiety refers to a fear of rejection and negative evaluation (being judged) by other people.

=== Existential ===
The philosopher Søren Kierkegaard, in The Concept of Anxiety (1844), described anxiety or dread associated with the "dizziness of freedom" and suggested the possibility for positive resolution of anxiety through the self-conscious exercise of responsibility and choosing. In Art and Artist (1932), the psychologist Otto Rank wrote that the psychological trauma of birth was the pre-eminent human symbol of existential anxiety and encompasses the creative person's simultaneous fear of – and desire for – separation, individuation, and differentiation.

The theologian Paul Tillich characterized existential anxiety as "the state in which a being is aware of its possible nonbeing", and he listed three categories for the nonbeing and resulting anxiety: ontic (fate and death), moral (guilt and condemnation), and spiritual (emptiness and meaninglessness). According to Tillich, the last of these three types of existential anxiety is predominant in modern times, while the others were predominant earlier. Tillich argues that spiritual anxiety can either be accepted as part of the human condition or resisted with negative consequences. In its pathological form, it may "drive the person toward the creation of certitude in systems of meaning which are supported by tradition and authority" even though such "undoubted certitude is not built on the rock of reality".

According to Viktor Frankl, the author of Man's Search for Meaning, when a person is faced with extreme mortal dangers, the most basic of all human wishes is to find a meaning of life to combat the "trauma of nonbeing" as death is near.

Depending on the source of the threat, psychoanalytic theory distinguishes three types of anxiety: realistic, neurotic and moral.

=== Test, performance, and competitive ===
==== Test ====
According to the Yerkes-Dodson law, an optimal level of arousal is necessary to best complete a task such as an exam, performance, or competitive event. However, when the anxiety or level of arousal exceeds that optimum, the result is a decline in performance.

Test anxiety is the uneasiness, apprehension, or nervousness felt by students who have a fear of failing an exam. Students who have test anxiety may experience any of the following: the association of grades with personal worth; fear of embarrassment by a teacher; fear of alienation from parents or friends; time pressures; or feeling a loss of control. Sweating, dizziness, headaches, racing heartbeats, nausea, fidgeting, uncontrollable crying or laughing and drumming on a desk are all common. Because test anxiety hinges on fear of negative evaluation, debate exists as to whether test anxiety is itself a unique anxiety disorder or whether it is a specific type of social phobia. The DSM-IV classifies test anxiety as a type of social phobia.

Research indicates that test anxiety among U.S. high-school and college students has been rising since the late 1950s. Test anxiety remains a challenge for students, regardless of age, and has considerable physiological and psychological impacts. Management of test anxiety focuses on achieving relaxation and developing mechanisms to manage anxiety. The routine practice of slow, Device-Guided Breathing (DGB) is a major component of behavioral treatments for anxiety conditions.

==== Performance and competitive ====
Performance anxiety and competitive anxiety (competitive trait anxiety, competitive state anxiety) happen when an individual's performance is measured against others. An important distinction between competitive and non-competitive anxiety is that competitive anxiety makes people view their performance as a threat. As a result, they experience a drop in their ordinary ability, whether physical or mental, due to that perceived stress.

Competitive anxiety is caused by a range of internal factors, including high expectations, outside pressure, lack of experience, and external factors like the location of a competition. It commonly occurs in those participating in high-pressure activities like sports and debates. Some common symptoms of competitive anxiety include muscle tension, fatigue, weakness, a sense of panic, apprehensiveness, and panic attacks.

There are 4 major theories of how anxiety affects performance: Drive theory, Inverted U theory, Reversal theory, and The Zone of Optimal Functioning theory.

Drive theory believes that anxiety is positive and performance improves proportionally to the level of anxiety. This theory is not well accepted.

The Inverted U theory is based on the idea that performance peaks at a moderate stress level. It is called Inverted U theory because the graph that plots performance against anxiety looks like an inverted "U".

Reversal theory suggests that performance increases in relation to the individual's interpretation of their arousal levels. If they believed their physical arousal level would help them, their performance would increase, if they didn't, their performance would decrease. For example: Athletes were shown to worry more when focusing on results and perfection rather than the effort and growth involved.

The Zone of Optimal Functioning theory proposes that there is a zone where positive and negative emotions are in a balance which lead to feelings of dissociation and intense concentration, optimizing the individual's performance levels.

=== Stranger, social, and intergroup anxiety ===
Humans generally require social acceptance and thus sometimes dread the disapproval of others. Apprehension of being judged by others may cause anxiety in social environments.

Anxiety during social interactions, particularly between strangers, is common among young people. It may persist into adulthood and become social anxiety or social phobia. "Stranger anxiety" in small children is not considered a phobia. In adults, an excessive fear of other people is not a developmentally common stage; it is called social anxiety. According to Cutting, social phobic do not fear the crowd but the fact that they may be judged negatively.

Social anxiety varies in degree and severity. For some people, it is characterized by experiencing discomfort or awkwardness during physical social contact (e.g. embracing, shaking hands, etc.), while in other cases it can lead to a fear of interacting with unfamiliar people altogether. Those with this condition may restrict their lifestyles to accommodate the anxiety, minimizing social interaction whenever possible. Social anxiety also forms a core aspect of certain personality disorders, including avoidant personality disorder.

To the extent that a person is fearful of social encounters with unfamiliar others, some people may experience anxiety particularly during interactions with outgroup members, or people who share different group memberships (i.e., by race, ethnicity, class, gender, etc.). Depending on the nature of the antecedent relations, cognitions, and situational factors, intergroup contact may be stressful and lead to feelings of anxiety. This apprehension or fear of contact with outgroup members is often called interracial or intergroup anxiety.

As is the case with the more generalized forms of social anxiety, intergroup anxiety has behavioral, cognitive, and affective effects. For instance, increases in schematic processing and simplified information processing can occur when anxiety is high. Indeed, such is consistent with related work on attentional bias in implicit memory. Additionally recent research has found that implicit racial evaluations (i.e. automatic prejudiced attitudes) can be amplified during intergroup interaction. Negative experiences have been illustrated in producing not only negative expectations, but also avoidant, or antagonistic, behavior such as hostility. Furthermore, when compared to anxiety levels and cognitive effort (e.g., impression management and self-presentation) in intragroup contexts, levels and depletion of resources may be exacerbated in the intergroup situation.

=== Trait ===
Anxiety can be either a short-term "state" or a long-term "personality trait". Trait anxiety reflects a stable tendency across the lifespan of responding with acute, state anxiety in the anticipation of threatening situations (whether they are actually deemed threatening or not). A meta-analysis showed that a high level of neuroticism is a risk factor for development of anxiety symptoms and disorders. Such anxiety may be conscious or unconscious.

Personality can also be a trait leading to anxiety and depression and their persistence. Through experience, many find it difficult to collect themselves due to their own personal nature.

=== Choice or decision ===
Anxiety induced by the need to choose between similar options is recognized as a problem for some individuals and for organizations. In 2004, Capgemini wrote: "Today we're all faced with greater choice, more competition and less time to consider our options or seek out the right advice." Overthinking a choice is called analysis paralysis.

In a decision context, unpredictability or uncertainty may trigger emotional responses in anxious individuals that systematically alter decision-making. There are primarily two forms of this anxiety type. The first form refers to a choice in which there are multiple potential outcomes with known or calculable probabilities. The second form refers to the uncertainty and ambiguity related to a decision context in which there are multiple possible outcomes with unknown probabilities.

=== Panic disorder ===
Panic disorder may share symptoms of stress and anxiety, but it is actually very different. Panic disorder is an anxiety disorder that occurs without any triggers. According to the U.S. Department of Health and Human Services, this disorder can be distinguished by unexpected and repeated episodes of intense fear. Someone with panic disorder will eventually develop constant fear of another attack and as this progresses it will begin to affect daily functioning and an individual's general quality of life. It is reported by the Cleveland Clinic that panic disorder affects 2 to 3 percent of adult Americans and can begin around the time of the teenage and early adult years. Some symptoms include: difficulty breathing, chest pain, dizziness, trembling or shaking, feeling faint, nausea, fear that you are losing control or are about to die. Even though they have these symptoms during an attack, the main symptom is the persistent fear of having future panic attacks.

== Anxiety disorders ==
Anxiety disorders are a group of mental disorders characterized by exaggerated feelings of anxiety and fear responses. Anxiety is a worry about future events and fear is a reaction to current events. These feelings may cause physical symptoms, such as a fast heart rate and shakiness. There are a number of anxiety disorders: including generalized anxiety disorder, specific phobia, social anxiety disorder, separation anxiety disorder, agoraphobia, panic disorder, and selective mutism. The disorder differs by what results in the symptoms. People often have more than one anxiety disorder.

Anxiety disorders are caused by a complex combination of genetic and environmental factors. To be diagnosed, symptoms typically need to be present for at least six months, be more than would be expected for the situation, and decrease a person's ability to function in their daily lives. Other problems that may result in similar symptoms include hyperthyroidism, heart disease, caffeine, alcohol, or cannabis use, and withdrawal from certain drugs, among others.

Without treatment, anxiety disorders tend to remain. Treatment may include lifestyle changes, counselling, and medications. Counselling is typically with a type of cognitive behavioral therapy. Medications, such as antidepressants or beta blockers, may improve symptoms. A 2023 review found that regular physical activity is effective for reducing anxiety.

About 12% of people are affected by an anxiety disorder in a given year and between 12% and 30% are affected at some point in their life. They occur about twice as often in women than they do in men, and generally begin before the age of 25. The most common anxiety disorders are specific phobias, which affect nearly 12% of people, and social anxiety disorder, which affects 10% of people at some point in their life. They affect those between the ages of 15 and 35 the most and become less common after the age of 55. Rates appear to be higher in the United States and Europe.

=== Short- and long-term anxiety ===
Anxiety can be either a short-term "state" or a long-term "trait". Whereas trait anxiety represents worrying about future events, anxiety disorders are a group of mental disorders characterized by feelings of anxiety and fears.

=== Four ways to be anxious ===
In his book Anxious: The Modern Mind in the Age of Anxiety Joseph LeDoux examines four experiences of anxiety through a brain-based lens:

1. In the presence of an existing or imminent external threat, you worry about the event and its implications for your physical and/or psychological well-being. When a threat signal occurs, it signifies either that danger is present or near in space and time or that it might be coming in the future. Nonconscious threats processing by the brain activates defensive survival circuits, resulting in changes in information processing in the brain, controlled in part by increases in arousal and behavioral and physiological responses in the body that then produce signals that feed back to the brain and complement the physiological changes there, intensifying them and extending their duration.
2. When you notice body sensations, you worry about what they might mean for your physical and/or psychological well-being. The trigger stimulus does not have to be an external stimulus but can be an internal one, as some people are particularly sensitive to body signals.
3. Thoughts and memories may lead to you to worry about your physical and/or psychological well-being. We do not need to be in the presence of an external or internal stimulus to be anxious. An episodic memory of a past trauma or of a panic attack in the past is sufficient to activate the defense circuits.
4. Thoughts and memories may result in existential dread, such as worry about leading a meaningful life or the eventuality of death. Examples are contemplations of whether one's life has been meaningful, the inevitability of death, or the difficulty of making decisions that have a moral value. These do not necessarily activate defensive systems; they are more or less pure forms of cognitive anxiety.

== Co-morbidity ==
Anxiety disorders often occur with other mental health disorders, particularly major depressive disorder, bipolar disorder, eating disorders, or certain personality disorders. It also commonly occurs with personality traits such as neuroticism. This observed co-occurrence is partly due to genetic and environmental influences shared between these traits and anxiety.

It is common for those with obsessive–compulsive disorder to experience anxiety. Anxiety is also commonly found in those who experience panic disorders, phobic anxiety disorders, severe stress, dissociative disorders, somatoform disorders, and some neurotic disorders. Anxiety has also been linked to the experience of intrusive thoughts. Studies have revealed that individuals who experience high levels of anxiety (also known as clinical anxiety) are highly vulnerable to the experience of intense intrusive thoughts or psychological disorders that are characterized by intrusive thoughts.

== Risk factors ==
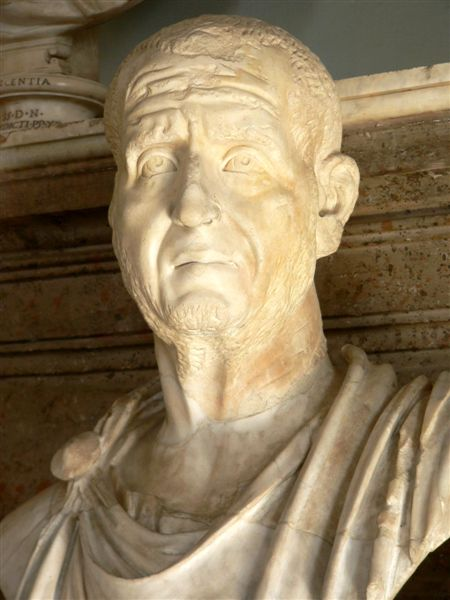
A marble bust of the Roman Emperor Decius from the Capitoline Museum, conveying "an impression of anxiety and weariness, as of a man shouldering heavy [state] responsibilities"

Anxiety disorders are partly genetic, with twin studies suggesting 30–40% genetic influence on individual differences in anxiety. Environmental factors are also important. Twin studies show that individual-specific environments have a large influence on anxiety, whereas shared environmental influences (environments that affect twins in the same way) operate during childhood but decline through adolescence. Specific measured 'environments' that have been associated with anxiety include child abuse, family history of mental health disorders, and poverty. Anxiety is also associated with drug use, including alcohol and caffeine, as well as benzodiazepines, which are often prescribed to treat anxiety.

Levy et al. says that the brain of a pregnant woman experiencing pregnancy‑specific anxiety appears to be working harder to maintain emotional equilibrium, even in the absence of explicit stressors. This interpretation shows that pregnancy involves substantial neurobiological adjustments, including shifts in networks involved in emotion regulation, anticipation, and self‑monitoring. The study adds to a growing literature suggesting that pregnancy‑specific emotional states have distinct neural signatures. By identifying a resting‑state marker linked to pregnancy‑related anxiety, Levy et al. highlight a potential tool for understanding which women may be more vulnerable to heightened stress during pregnancy or postpartum (Levy et al., 2025).

=== Genetics ===
Genetics and family history (e.g. parental anxiety) may put an individual at increased risk of an anxiety disorder, but generally external stimuli will trigger its onset or exacerbation. Estimates of genetic influence on anxiety, based on studies of twins, range from 25 to 40% depending on the specific type and age-group under study. For example, genetic differences account for about 43% of variance in panic disorder and 28% in generalized anxiety disorder. Longitudinal twin studies have shown the moderate stability of anxiety from childhood through to adulthood is mainly influenced by stability in genetic influence. When investigating how anxiety is passed on from parents to children, it is important to account for sharing of genes as well as environments, for example using the intergenerational children-of-twins design.

Many studies in the past used a candidate gene approach to test whether single genes were associated with anxiety. These investigations were based on hypotheses about how certain known genes influence neurotransmitters (such as serotonin and norepinephrine) and hormones (such as cortisol) that are implicated in anxiety. None of these findings are well replicated, with the possible exception of TMEM132D, COMT and MAO-A. The epigenetic signature of BDNF, a gene that codes for a protein called brain derived neurotrophic factor that is found in the brain, has also been associated with anxiety and specific patterns of neural activity. and a receptor gene for BDNF called NTRK2 was associated with anxiety in a large genome-wide investigation. The reason that most candidate gene findings have not replicated is that anxiety is a complex trait that is influenced by many genomic variants, each of which has a small effect on its own. Increasingly, studies of anxiety are using a hypothesis-free approach to look for parts of the genome that are implicated in anxiety using big enough samples to find associations with variants that have small effects. The largest explorations of the common genetic architecture of anxiety have been facilitated by the UK Biobank, the ANGST consortium and the CRC Fear, Anxiety and Anxiety Disorders.

==== Epigenetics ====
Epigenetics of anxiety and stress-related disorders is the field studying the relationship between epigenetic modifications of genes and anxiety and stress-related disorders, including mental health disorders such as generalized anxiety disorder (GAD), post-traumatic stress disorder (PTSD), obsessive–compulsive disorder (OCD), and others. These changes can lead to transgenerational stress inheritance. Epigenetic modifications play a role in the development and heritability of these disorders and related symptoms. For example, regulation of the hypothalamic–pituitary–adrenal axis (HPA) by glucocorticoids plays a major role in the stress response and is known to be epigenetically regulated.

As of 2015, most work had been done in animal models in laboratories, and little work had been done in humans; the work was not yet applicable to clinical psychiatry. Stress-induced epigenetic changes, particularly to genes that affect the HPA axis, persist into future generations, negatively impacting the capacity of offspring to adapt to stress. Early-life experiences, even when generations removed, can cause permanent epigenetic modifications of DNA packaging, resulting in changes in gene expression, endocrine function, and metabolism. Heritable epigenetic modifications include DNA methylation of the promoter regions of genes that affect sensitivity to stress.

=== Medical conditions ===
Many medical conditions can cause anxiety. This includes conditions that affect the ability to breathe, like COPD and asthma, and the difficulty in breathing that often occurs near death. Conditions that cause abdominal pain or chest pain can cause anxiety and may in some cases be a somatization of anxiety; the same is true for some sexual dysfunctions. Conditions that affect the face or the skin can cause social anxiety especially among adolescents, and developmental disabilities often lead to social anxiety for children as well. Life-threatening conditions like cancer also cause anxiety.

Furthermore, certain organic diseases may present with anxiety or symptoms that mimic anxiety. These disorders include certain endocrine diseases (hypo- and hyperthyroidism, hyperprolactinemia), metabolic disorders (diabetes), deficiency states (low levels of vitamin D, B2, B12, folic acid), gastrointestinal diseases (celiac disease, non-celiac gluten sensitivity, inflammatory bowel disease), heart diseases, blood diseases (anemia), cerebral vascular accidents (transient ischemic attack, stroke), and brain degenerative diseases (Parkinson's disease, dementia, multiple sclerosis, Huntington's disease), among others.

=== Substance-induced ===
Several drugs can cause or worsen anxiety, whether in intoxication, withdrawal or as side effect. These include alcohol, tobacco, sedatives (including prescription benzodiazepines), opioids (including prescription pain killers and illicit drugs like heroin), stimulants (such as caffeine, cocaine and amphetamines), hallucinogens, and inhalants.

While many often report self-medicating anxiety with these substances, improvements in anxiety from drugs are usually short-lived (with worsening of anxiety in the long term, sometimes with acute anxiety as soon as the drug effects wear off) and tend to be exaggerated. Acute exposure to toxic levels of benzene may cause euphoria, anxiety, and irritability lasting up to 2 weeks after the exposure.

=== Psychological ===
Mental state in terms of challenge level and skill level, according to Csikszentmihalyi's flow model. (Click on a fragment of the image to go to the appropriate article)

Poor coping skills (e.g., rigidity/inflexible problem solving, denial, avoidance, impulsivity, extreme self-expectation, negative thoughts, affective instability, and inability to focus on problems) are associated with anxiety. Anxiety is also linked and perpetuated by the person's own pessimistic outcome expectancy and how they cope with feedback negativity. Temperament (e.g., neuroticism) and attitudes (e.g. pessimism) have been found to be risk factors for anxiety.

Cognitive distortions such as overgeneralizing, catastrophizing, mind reading, emotional reasoning, binocular trick, and mental filter can result in anxiety. For example, an overgeneralized belief that something bad "always" happens may lead someone to have excessive fears of even minimally risky situations and to avoid benign social situations due to anticipatory anxiety of embarrassment. In addition, those who have high anxiety can also create future stressful life events. Together, these findings suggest that anxious thoughts can lead to anticipatory anxiety as well as stressful events, which in turn cause more anxiety. Such unhealthy thoughts can be targets for successful treatment with cognitive therapy.

Psychodynamic theory posits that anxiety is often the result of opposing unconscious wishes or fears that manifest via maladaptive defense mechanisms (such as suppression, repression, anticipation, regression, somatization, passive aggression, dissociation) that develop to adapt to problems with early objects (e.g., caregivers) and empathic failures in childhood. For example, persistent parental discouragement of anger may result in repression/suppression of angry feelings which manifests as gastrointestinal distress (somatization) when provoked by another while the anger remains unconscious and outside the individual's awareness. Such conflicts can be targets for successful treatment with psychodynamic therapy. While psychodynamic therapy tends to explore the underlying roots of anxiety, cognitive behavioral therapy targets the thoughts and behaviours that keep anxiety going. A meta-analysis of 41 randomized placebo-controlled trials found it moderately efficacious across anxiety and related disorders (Hedges' g = 0.56 on target symptoms), with the largest effects in obsessive–compulsive disorder, generalized anxiety disorder and acute stress disorder, and smaller ones in post-traumatic stress disorder, social anxiety disorder and panic disorder.

==== Evolutionary psychology ====
An evolutionary psychology explanation is that increased anxiety serves the purpose of increased vigilance regarding potential threats in the environment as well as increased tendency to take proactive actions regarding such possible threats. This may cause false positive reactions but an individual with anxiety may also avoid real threats. This may explain why anxious people are less likely to die due to accidents. There is ample empirical evidence that anxiety can have adaptive value. Within a school, timid fish are more likely than bold fish to survive a predator.

When people are confronted with unpleasant and potentially harmful stimuli such as foul odors or tastes, PET-scans show increased blood flow in the amygdala. In these studies, the participants also reported moderate anxiety. This might indicate that anxiety is a protective mechanism designed to prevent the organism from engaging in potentially harmful behaviors.

=== Social ===
Social risk factors for anxiety include a history of trauma (e.g., physical, sexual or emotional abuse or assault), bullying, early life experiences and parenting factors (e.g., rejection, lack of warmth, high hostility, harsh discipline, high parental negative affect, anxious childrearing, modelling of dysfunctional and drug-abusing behavior, discouragement of emotions, poor socialization, poor attachment, and child abuse and neglect), cultural factors (e.g., higher rates of anxiety in collectivistic cultures and persecuted minorities including those with disabilities), and socioeconomics (e.g., uneducated, unemployed, impoverished although developed countries have higher rates of anxiety disorders than developing countries). A 2019 comprehensive systematic review of over 50 studies showed that food insecurity in the United States is strongly associated with depression, anxiety, and sleep disorders. Food-insecure individuals had an almost 3 fold risk increase of testing positive for anxiety when compared to food-secure individuals.

==== Gender socialization ====
Contextual factors that are thought to contribute to anxiety include gender socialization and learning experiences. In particular, learning mastery (the degree to which people perceive their lives to be under their own control) and instrumentality, which includes such traits as self-confidence, self-efficacy, independence, and competitiveness fully mediate the relation between gender and anxiety. That is, though gender differences in anxiety exist, with higher levels of anxiety in women compared to men, gender socialization and learning mastery explain these gender differences.

== Treatment ==
The first step in the management of a person with anxiety symptoms involves evaluating the possible presence of an underlying medical cause, the recognition of which is essential in order to decide the correct treatment. Anxiety symptoms may mask an organic disease, or appear associated with or as a result of a medical disorder. Anxiety is considered to be a serious psychiatric illness that has an unknown true pervasiveness due to affected individuals not asking for proper treatment or aid, and due to professionals missing the diagnosis.

Cognitive behavioral therapy (CBT) is effective for anxiety disorders and is a first line treatment. CBT appears to be equally effective when carried out via the internet. While evidence for mental health apps is promising, it is preliminary.

=== Medications ===
Psychopharmacological treatment can be used in parallel to CBT or can be used alone. As a general rule, most anxiety disorders respond well to first-line agents. Such drugs, also used as antidepressants, are the selective serotonin reuptake inhibitors (SSRIs) and serotonin-norepinephrine reuptake inhibitors (SNRIs), that work by blocking the reuptake of specific neurotransmitters and resulting in the increase in availability of these neurotransmitters.

Additionally, benzodiazepines are often prescribed to individuals with anxiety disorder. Benzodiazepines produce an anxiolytic response by modulating GABA_{A} receptor and increasing its receptor binding. However, they should not usually be given for longer than 2–4 weeks. The only medications National Institute for Health and Clinical Excellence recommends for the longer-term management of anxiety are antidepressants, due to rapid development of tolerance, addiction and physical dependence during benzodiazepine therapy.

A third common treatment involves a category of drug known as serotonin agonists, such as those that belong to azapirone class. This category of drug works by initiating a physiological response at 5-HT_{1A} receptor by increasing the action of serotonin at this receptor. Other treatment options include pregabalin, tricyclic or tetracyclic antidepressants (such as mirtazapine), and moclobemide, among others.

== Prevention ==
The above risk factors give natural avenues for prevention. Psychological or educational interventions have a small yet statistically significant benefit for the prevention of anxiety in varied population types. Improvement in dietary intake and habits may also help lower the risk of anxiety.

== See also ==
- Angst – Intense feeling of apprehension, anxiety, or inner turmoil
- Fear – Basic emotion induced by a perceived threat
- Tripartite Model of Anxiety and Depression – Model of anxiety and depression
- Uncanny – Psychological experience of something being strangely familiar
- Mental stress-induced myocardial ischemia
- Rumination (psychology)
