= Odayme Quesada =

American cardiologist

- Alma mater: University of Florida; Yale School of Medicine
- Employer: The Christ Hospital

External videos
- How to prevent heart disease with Odayme Quesada, MD, The Christ Hospital, Feb 15, 2023
- "Having a Heart-to-Heart with Dr. Odayme Quesada", Cincy Lifestyle, Oct 21, 2020.

Odayme Quesada is a cardiologist who specializes in heart diseases in women. Quesada holds the Ginger Warner Endowed Chair in Women's Cardiovascular Health and is the medical director of The Women's Heart Center at The Christ Hospital Health Network, Cincinnati.

== Early life and education ==
Quesada grew up in Cuba before moving to Miami. She earned her Bachelor's degree in chemistry from the University of Florida. She received her MD and MHS degrees from Yale University School of Medicine. This was followed by a residency in internal medicine at the University of California San Francisco (UCSF) and a cardiovascular research fellowship at the Smidt Heart Institute of Cedars-Sinai Medical Center, where she worked with C. Noel Bairey Merz.

== Career ==
Quesada is the medical director of The Women's Heart Center at Christ Hospital Health Network, Cincinnati, where she holds the Ginger Warner Endowed Chair in Women's Cardiovascular Health. Quesada established The Women's Heart Center and the Coronary Microvascular and Vasomotor Dysfunction (CMVD) program at The Christ Hospital as of 2020.

Quesada studies cardiovascular diseases and the long-term effects of persistent social and economic factors such as childhood adversity, financial disadvantage, intimate partner violence and caregiver stress, all of which disproportionately affect women. Women are encouraged to improve health and reduce stress through exercise, mindfulness and yoga, and to seek support from health and mental health resources. Quesada is fluent in Spanish and works to improve the health of Latina women, who are both at higher risk and culturally diverse, through the Latina Heart Health Awareness Campaign.

Quesada researches connections between hypertensive disorders of pregnancy and cardiovascular disease. Pregnant women who experience preeclampsia have up to a fourfold risk for early heart disease. Quesada's center is also part of the WARRIOR trial (Women's Ischemia Trial to Reduce Events in Non-Obstructive Coronary Artery Disease, NCT03417388) and the FREEDOM Trial, using cell therapy to attempt to repair coronary artery damage in cases such as coronary microvascular disease.

== Awards and honors ==
- National Institute of Health (NIH) Career Development Award
- 2022, Health Care Hero, Cincinnati Business Courier
- 2025, Robert A. Winn Excellence in Clinical Trials Awardee

== Selected publications ==
- Rai, B; Shukla, J; Henry, TD; Quesada, O (8 May 2021). "Angiogenic CD34 Stem Cell Therapy in Coronary Microvascular Repair-A Systematic Review". Cells. 10 (5): 1137. doi:10.3390/cells10051137. PMC 8151216. PMID 34066713.
- Ashokprabhu, ND; Quesada, O; Alvarez, YR; Henry, TD (June 2023). "INOCA/ANOCA: Mechanisms and novel treatments". American Heart Journal Plus: Cardiology Research and Practice. 30 100302. doi:10.1016/j.ahjo.2023.100302. PMC 10299803. PMID 37377840.
- Quesada, O; Kulandavelu, S; Vladutiu, CJ; DeFranco, E; Minissian, MB; Makarem, N; Bello, NA; Wong, MS; Pabón, MA; Chandra, AA; Avilés-Santa, L; Rodríguez, CJ; Bairey Merz, CN; Sofer, T; Hurwitz, BE; Talavera, GA; Claggett, BL; Solomon, SD; Cheng, S (February 2024). "Cardiac Abnormalities in Hispanic/Latina Women With Prior De Novo Hypertensive Disorders of Pregnancy". Hypertension. 81 (2): 255–263. doi:10.1161/HYPERTENSIONAHA.123.21248. PMC 10793810. PMID 38047358.
- Ebong, IA; Quesada, O; Fonkoue, IT; Mattina, D; Sullivan, S; Oliveira, GMM; Spikes, T; Sharma, J; Commodore, Y; Ogunniyi, MO; Aggarwal, NR; Vaccarino, V; American College of Cardiology Cardiovascular Disease in Women, Committee (16 July 2024). "The Role of Psychosocial Stress on Cardiovascular Disease in Women: JACC State-of-the-Art Review". Journal of the American College of Cardiology. 84 (3): 298–314. doi:10.1016/j.jacc.2024.05.016. PMC 11328148. PMID 38986672.
- Tapp, DN; Ashokprabhu, ND; Hamstra, MS; Losekamp, M; Schmidt, C; Palmer, C; Julie Gallatin, NP; Tierney, D; Trenaman, T; Canoniero, M; Frizzell, J; Henry, TD; Quesada, O (December 2024). "Developing a Women's Heart Center With a Specialization in Coronary Microvascular and Vasomotor Dysfunction: If You Build It, They Will Come". Catheterization and Cardiovascular Interventions. 104 (7): 1337–1343. doi:10.1002/ccd.31281. PMC 12376972. PMID 39506505.
- Toleva, O; Smilowitz, NR; Quesada, O; Kesarwani, M; Savage, MP; Prasad, M; Barseghian El-Farra, A; Holoshitz, N; Moses, JW; Fearon, WF; Tremmel, JA; Samuels, B; Henry, TD; Microvascular, Network (July 2025). "Current Evidence-Based Treatment of Angina With Nonobstructive Coronary Arteries (ANOCA)". Journal of the Society for Cardiovascular Angiography & Interventions. 4 (7) 102633. doi:10.1016/j.jscai.2025.102633. PMC 12418408. PMID 40933110.
