= Tripartite Model of Anxiety and Depression =

Model of anxiety and depression

Watson and Clark (1991) proposed the Tripartite Model of Anxiety and Depression to help explain the comorbidity between anxious and depressive symptoms and disorders. This model divides the symptoms of anxiety and depression into three groups: negative affect, positive affect and physiological hyperarousal. These three sets of symptoms help explain common and distinct aspects of depression and anxiety.

The ability to distinguish between anxiety and depression with this model may help increase diagnostic accuracy and help eliminate the complications that occur with comorbidity. According to Clark, depressed patients have a comorbidity rate of 57% for any anxiety disorder. Other studies in youth have revealed comorbidity rates of anxiety and depression as high as 70%. There are many negative effects of anxiety-depression comorbidity. The negative effects of comorbidity include: chronicity, recovery and relapse rates, and higher suicide risk. Among youth samples, negative effects of anxiety-depression comorbidity include: increased substance abuse, more likely to attempt suicide, receive a diagnosis of conduct disorder, and are less likely to show favorable gains from treatment.

== Factors ==
=== Negative affect ===
Negative affect is the factor that is common to both anxiety and depression. Negative affect can be defined as, "the extent to which an individual feels upset or unpleasantly engaged, rather than peaceful". It involves negative mood states such as subjective distress, fear, disgust, scorn, and hostility. Mood states that are specific to depression include sadness and loneliness that have large factor loadings on negative affect. Some common symptoms of negative affect include: insomnia, restlessness, irritability, and poor concentration.

There is a substantial amount of empirical research on negative affect (NA) and its role in the tripartite model. For example, the Mood and Anxiety Symptom Questionnaire (MASQ) was administered to a sample of college students and a sample of psychiatric patients. The correlations between the specific anxiety scale (anxious arousal) in the MASQ and NA were moderate (rs= .41 and .47), supporting that NA is specific to anxiety disorders, congruent with the tripartite model. Another study consisted of a sample of children (ages 7–14) diagnosed with a principal anxiety disorder. The children completed the Positive and Negative Affect Scale for Children (PANAS-C). The results showed NA was significantly associated with measure of anxiety and depression. A study by Chorpita in 2002, was consistent with the tripartite model. In a large sample of school-aged children, NA was positively correlated with all anxiety and depression scales.

=== Physiological hyperarousal ===
Physiological hyperarousal is defined by increased activity in the sympathetic nervous system, in response to threat. Physiological hyperarousal is unique to anxiety disorders. Some symptoms of physiological hyperarousal include: shortness of breath, feeling dizzy or lightheaded, dry mouth, trembling or shaking, and sweaty palms.

Compared to negative affect and positive affect, physiological hyperarousal has been studied less. Chorpita et al. (2000), proposed an affect and arousal scale in order to measure the tripartite factors of emotion in children and adolescents. In this study, physiological hyperarousal was positively correlated with negative affect but not positive affect. This supports the tripartite model hypothesis, that physiological hyperarousal will distinguish anxiety from depression, which is related to positive affect. Another study by Joiner et al. (1999), analyzed the construct validity of physiological hyperarousal. Data were collected from samples of psychotherapy outpatients, air force cadets, and undergraduate students. Confirmatory factor analyses showed that psychological hyperarousal is a reliable, replicable, valid, and discriminable construct.

=== Positive affect ===
Positive affect is a dimension that reflects one's level of pleasurable engagement with their environment. High positive affect is made up of enthusiasm, energy level, mental alertness, interest, joy, social dominance, adventurousness, and activeness. In contrast, a low level of positive affect, or absence of, is called anhedonia. Anhedonia is described as the loss of interest or the inability to experience pleasure when experiencing things that used to be pleasurable. Low levels of positive affect in the Tripartite Model characterize depression. Signs of low positive affect include fatigue, loneliness, sadness, and lethargy. Positive affect is important because it is a construct used in order to differentiate depression from anxiety.

Many studies were completed to evaluate the role of positive affect in the tripartite model. A sample of university students were administered the Positive and Negative Affective Schedule (PANAS), the Beck Depression Inventory (BDI), and the Beck Anxiety Inventory (BAI). The results of this study were congruent with low Positive Affect predicting depression. A longitudinal study was completed with a sample of students in grade 6 and later grade 9. The students completed the Baltimore How I Feel (BHIF), a measure of anxious and depressive symptoms. This study confirmed the PA aspect of the tripartite model. A study with a sample of inpatient children/adolescents was consistent with the tripartite model as well. Findings from a study in 2006 of a community sample of youth supported the tripartite in youth and further supported that anxiety and depression do represent unique syndromes in youth based on differences found in positive affect. Many studies looked at samples of youth but studies were also done with older adult samples. A study consisting of psychiatric outpatients, ages 55–87, confirmed that positive affect was significantly more related to depression than anxiety symptoms.

== Measures ==
=== PANAS ===
The Positive and Negative Affect Schedule (PANAS) was developed by Watson, Clark, and Tellegen in 1988. This scale is brief, easy to administer, and is used to measure positive affect and negative affect. The scale uses 20 adjectives that describe different moods ranging from excited to upset. There are 10 positive affect adjectives and 10 negative affect adjectives. Individuals are asked to rate each adjective on a 5-point scale (1 – very slightly or not at all to 5 – extremely) based on how they feel. The time frame in which they make these ratings varies based on the study.

=== MASQ ===
Watson and Clark established the 90-item Mood and Anxiety Symptom Questionnaire (MASQ). The MASQ consists of five subscales that measure: mixed general distress symptoms (GD: Mixed, 15 items), general distress depressive symptoms (GD: Depression, 12 items), general distress anxiety symptoms (GD: Anxiety, 11 items), anxious arousal symptoms (Anxious Arousal, 17 items) and anhedonic depression symptoms (Anhedonic Depression, 22 items). All individual items are rated on a scale 1 to 5, where 1 (not at all) indicates the individual has not felt this way at all during the past week and 5 (extremely) indicates that they have felt this way extremely.
