= Somatic anxiety =

Physical manifestation of anxiety

Somatic anxiety, also known as somatization, is the physical manifestation of anxiety. It is commonly contrasted with cognitive anxiety, which is the mental manifestation of anxiety, or the specific thought processes that occur during anxiety, such as concern or worry. These components of anxiety are especially studied in sports psychology, specifically relating to how the anxiety symptoms affect athletic performance.

Associated symptoms typically include "abdominal pain, dyspepsia, chest pain, fatigue, dizziness, insomnia, and headache". These symptoms can happen either alone or in a cluster.

Research on somatic anxiety is increasing. Studies have reported that some medically overlooked cases that could not relate physical pain to any type of organ dysfunction typically could have been somatic anxiety.

== Anxiety-performance relationship theories ==
=== Drive theory ===
The Drive Theory suggests that if an athlete is both skilled and driven (by somatic and cognitive anxiety) then the athlete will perform well.

=== Inverted-U hypothesis ===
A graph showing the Inverted-U hypothesis. In this context, arousal refers to somatic anxiety.

The Inverted-U Hypothesis, also known as the Yerkes-Dodson law hypothesizes that as somatic and cognitive anxiety (l) increase, performance increases until a threshold is crossed. Should arousal increase further, performance decreases.

=== Multi-dimensional theory ===
The Multi-dimensional Theory of Anxiety is based on the distinction between somatic and cognitive anxiety. The theory predicts that a negative, linear relationship between somatic and cognitive anxiety, an Inverted-U relationship between somatic anxiety and performance, and that somatic anxiety declines once performance begins although cognitive anxiety may remain high, if confidence is low.

=== Catastrophe theory ===
Catastrophe Theory suggests that stress, combined with both somatic and cognitive anxiety, influences performance, that somatic anxiety affects each athlete and each performance differently, limiting the ability to predict an outcome using general rules.

=== Optimum arousal theory ===
Optimum Arousal Theory states that each athlete performs best if their anxiety Alevel falls within an "optimum functioning zone".

== See also ==
- Somatic symptom disorder

== Additional references ==
- Schwartz, Gary E; Davidson, Richard J; Goleman, Daniel J (1978). "Patterning of Cognitive and Somatic Processes in the Self-Regulation of Anxiety: Effects of Meditation versus Exercise". Psychosomatic Medicine. 40 (4): 321–328. doi:10.1097/00006842-197806000-00004. PMID 356080. S2CID 2810663.
