= Instantaneous wave-free ratio =

Tool for determining arterial narrowing

- Synonyms: Instant flow reserve
- Purpose: ascertain if individual has a stenosis

The instantaneous wave-free ratio (iFR, sometimes referred to as the instant wave-free ratio or instant flow reserve) is a diagnostic tool used to assess whether a stenosis is causing a limitation of blood flow in coronary arteries with subsequent ischemia. iFR is performed during cardiac catheterisation (angiography) using invasive coronary pressure wires which are placed in the coronary arteries that are to be assessed. Pressure wires are commonly used by interventional cardiologists to guide decisions to perform revascularization, either by stenting or bypass surgery.

== Assessment of coronary stenoses ==
Coronary artery blockages or stenoses that limit blood flow to the heart muscle can cause angina and can be treated by stenting or bypass surgery. Relief of a stenosis by stenting aims to restore vessel patency with improvement in blood flow leading to a reduction in angina symptoms. However, if stenoses are not flow limiting, then they can be safely left alone without stenting or surgery and this help reduce patient's exposure to unnecessary procedures and potential complications. Identifying stenoses that cause flow limitation, or ischaemia, can be done in a variety of ways. Non-invasive tests can include stress testing such as exercise electrocardiograms, stress echocardiography, or perfusion imaging tests such as scintigraphy, SPECT, or PET. Alternatively, invasive tests can be performed at the time of angiography, and these include those that measure coronary flow velocity in the vessel, CFR or index flow against pressure gradients such as hyperaemic or basal stenosis resistance (HSR or BSR). More commonly coronary pressure measurements are used as a surrogate for flow measurement and techniques include iFR and fractional flow reserve (FFR). Cardiologists use a combination of these investigations together with the patient's history, symptoms and clinical risk factors to decide if a stenosis requires further treatment. An example of use in clinical practice is seen here.

== iFR definition and calculation ==
iFR calculation uses a ratio of proximal and distal coronary pressures over the wave-free period in diastole

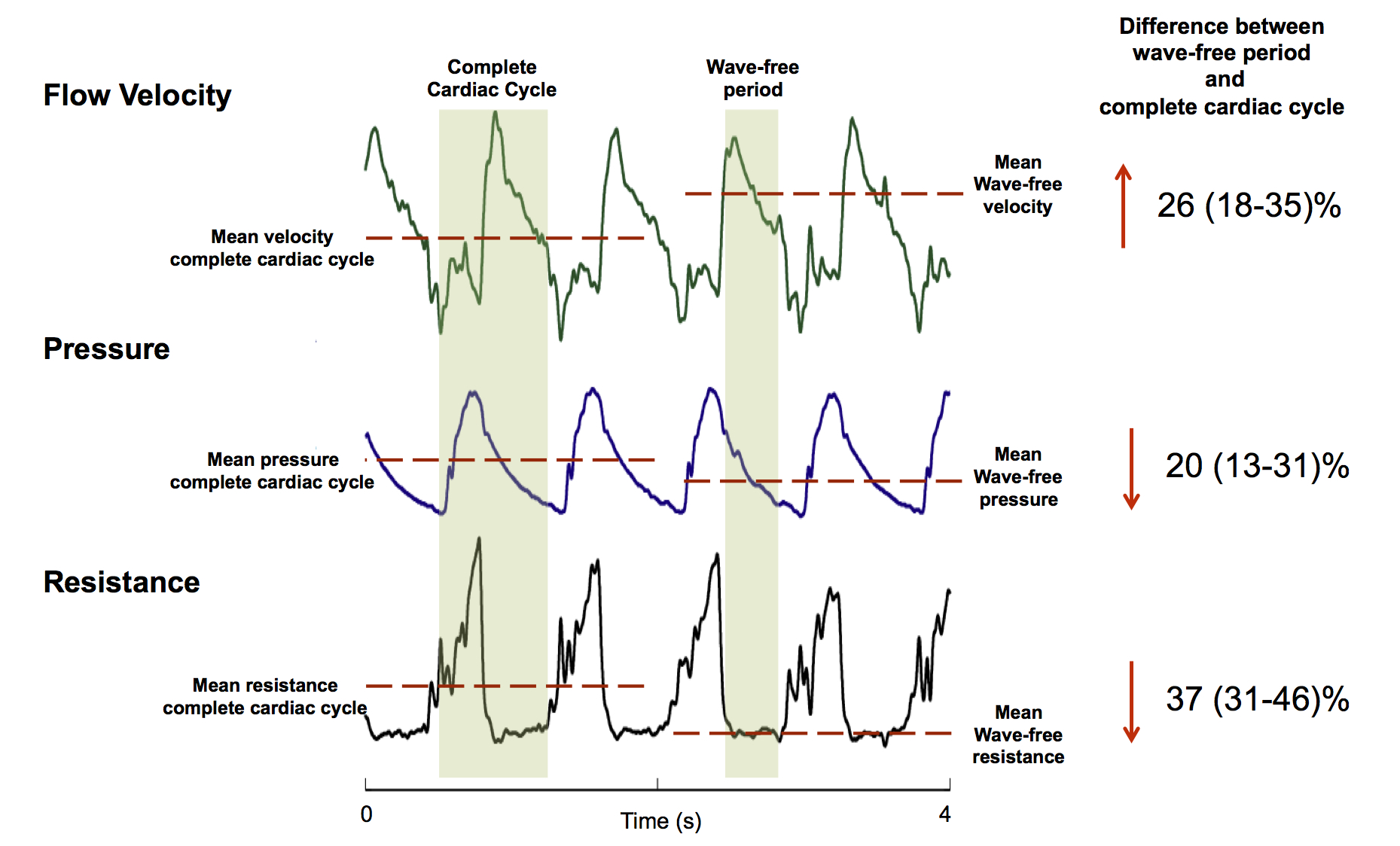
The flow velocity, pressure, and instantaneous microvascular resistance were calculated over the wave-free period and during that of the complete cardiac cycle. Flow velocity is higher, and pressure is lower over the wave-free period. This results in lower microvascular resistance during the wave-free period in comparison to the complete cardiac cycle. Values are expressed as median+/-interquartile range. Used with permission: Sen S, Asrress KN, Nijjer S, et al. J Am Coll Cardiol 2013;61:1409–20.

Instantaneous wave-free ratio is performed using high fidelity pressure wires that are passed distal to the coronary stenosis. iFR isolates a specific period in diastole, called the wave-free period, and uses the ratio of distal coronary pressure (Pd) to the pressure observed in the aorta (Pa) over this period. During this wave-free period, the competing forces (waves) that affect coronary flow are quiescent meaning pressure and flow are linearly related as compared to the rest of the cardiac cycle.

When stenoses are flow limiting, Pd and Pa pressures over the wave-free period diverge; a normal ratio is 1.0 and iFR values of below 0.90 suggest flow limitation. iFR can be calculated using dedicated consoles available for medical use and typically uses an average over 5 heart beats but can be performed using a single heart beat. iFR is measured at rest, without the need for pharmacological vasodilators or stressors and compares well to other invasive and non-invasive markers of ischemia or flow limitation.

== Studies ==
A number of studies using the Imperial College developed iFR algorithm have been conducted.

The ADVISE study was a proof of concept study that demonstrated that the wave-free period, usually isolated using wave-intensity analysis, could be reliably determined using a pressure-only approach. This was shown across a variety of stenosis severities and demonstrated that over that specific period in diastole, microcirculatory resistance was the lowest and most stable compared to the rest of the cardiac cycle. During this specific period, pressure and flow are linearly related, allowing pressure-only inferences of transtenotic flow limitation. iFR was compared to the current clinically used reference standard, FFR, and demonstrated good diagnostic lesion classification. Furthermore, iFR was consistent in utility for the left and right coronary artery, and the wave-free period was stable from beat-to-beat and even in the presence of arrhythmia. The study however was relatively underpowered to determine a clinical cut-point.

The ADVISE-Registry was a larger study in which pressure wire data collected from patients undergoing functional assessment for clinical management, was analysed to compare iFR and FFR. This study recognised that matching FFR was limited by the capacity of FFR to match itself with repeated measures and accordingly presented per-range agreements. An independent consecutive blinded comparison of iFR and FFR in Asian patients reported similar results.

The CLARIFY study was a physiological study in which iFR and FFR were compared to an independent third measure, hyperaemic stenosis resistance (HSR) which uses a combination of pressure and flow assessment to detect ischemia. Both measures compared equally well to this flow-based index. In stenoses classified as ischemic, the wave-free period provided a similar reduction in microvascular resistance as adenosine-mediated hyperaemia over the whole cardiac cycle.

The Hybrid iFR-FFR approach has been proposed as method of minimising patient exposure to adenosine or other vasodilators. In this approach, an iFR can be measured, and stenoses with an iFR >0.93 may be deferred while those with an iFR <0.86 can be treated by revascularization. Stenoses with an iFR between 0.86-0.93 can undergo an FFR assessment to guide therapy. This range can be changed by the physician according to how closely they want to match an FFR-classification of lesions. Using this typical range, almost 60% of stenoses can be spared from needing vasodilator infusion.

ADVISE-II has prospectively assessed the hybrid approach in an independent international multi-centre study which confirmed the findings of the earlier Hybrid analysis. Interim results were reported by Javier Escaned at EuroPCR, the final findings were presented at TCT 2013.

These findings have been in keeping with an international collaborative study, RESOLVE, which pooled retrospective data from many centres worldwide with independent core-lab analysis of raw pressure traces. Conflicting data, when re-analysed using the clinically available iFR-algorithms produced results similar to the ADVISE-Registry and ADVISE Hybrid studies.

iFR has also been compared to FFR and the resting Pd/Pa ratio in the post-coronary intervention setting. In a manner similar to FFR, iFR can be used to measure the haemodynamic change induced by stent placement and detect the impact of any residual stenoses.

The ADVISE-in-Practice study reported the first clinical experience of the commercially available iFR console. Video examples of iFR technology in clinical use are available here .

== iFR clinical outcome studies ==
Two outcome studies, DEFINE-FLAIR and the iFR-SWEDEHEART will assess whether patient outcomes differ if stenoses are treated according to iFR or FFR classification of stenosis severity. DEFINE-FLAIR, which aims to recruit 2500 patients, will be the largest physiological study to date and will provide the first randomised data of the use of iFR and FFR in patients with both stable coronary disease and acute coronary syndromes. It will also provide the first randomised data of the clinical utility of FFR in guiding and deferring coronary intervention outside of the FAME and DEFER studies. Both DEFINE-FLAIR and iFR-SWEDEHEART have harmonised clinical endpoints which will enable combined analysis of over 4500 patients.

SYTNAX II is a modern PCI study assessing the clinical utility of stenting three-vessel coronary disease. Patients with three-vessel coronary disease whom the Heart Team decide are in equipoise between surgical revascularization or PCI intervention, undergo physiologically guided stenting. The SYNTAX II clinical risk calculator is used to determine equipoise. All major vessels undergo pressure wire assessment using the iFR-FFR hybrid approach, and only those positive for ischaemia undergo stenting. Intravascular ultrasound is used to ensure optimal stent delivery. Clinical outcomes will be compared to a historical surgical cohort from SYNTAX-I study.

== iFR physiological mapping of coronary vessels ==
The instantaneous wave-free ratio can also be calculated on a beat-to-beat basis. If performed during the slow withdrawal of a pressure wire (referred to as 'pullback') under resting conditions, it is possible to plot the change of iFR or trans-stenotic gradient over the wave-free period throughout the vessel. This can help identify focal and diffuse coronary disease potentially amenable to revascularisation. An example of pullback in clinical use can be seen in this video. The pressure wire data can be co-registered with the angiographic findings to aid ease of interpretation. With mechanised pullback approaches which move the pressure wire at a fixed speed, the physiological length of a stenosis can be determined. With advanced live co-registration this is also feasible with during manual pullback.

Advanced computer processing can utilise iFR-pullback data to predict the hemodynamic consequences of performing percutaneous coronary intervention (PCI) to a chosen segment of the coronary vessel. The predicted iFR values produced by the virtual-PCI on the iFR-pullback are closely related to those observed after PCI in the coronary vessel. This predictive capacity may provide added advantage to Interventional Cardiologists when assessing multiple coronary stenoses in a single vessel and planning the treatment approach. iFR-pullback technologies are undergoing evaluation in European centres.

== Controversy ==
Alternative iFR computation systems have been proposed, for example incorporating part of systole into the definition of diastole and optionally different time-shifts between Pd and Pa signals, yielding unsatisfactory results. The same datasets reanalysed using the standard algorithms confirm the mainstream findings. Various explanations have been proposed.
