= Mir-26 microRNA precursor family =

Precursor microRNA family

mir-26 microRNA precursor family
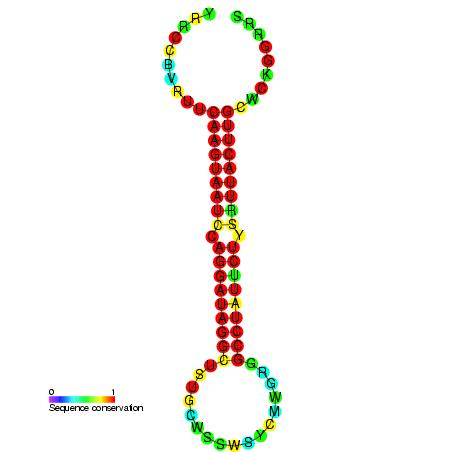
- Predicted secondary structure and sequence conservation of mir-26

Identifiers
- Symbol: mir-26
- Rfam: RF00244
- miRBase: MI0000083
- miRBase family: MIPF0000043

Other data
- RNA type: Gene; miRNA
- Domain: Eukaryota
- GO: GO:0035195 GO:0035068
- SO: SO:0001244
- PDB structures: PDBe

== Origins ==
The miR-26 microRNA is a small non-coding RNA that is involved in regulating gene expression. The miR-26 family is composed of miR-26a-1, miR-26a-2 and miR-26b located in chromosomes 3, 12 and 2, respectively. Pre-miR-26 with stem-loop structure is processed into mature miR-26 by a series of enzymes of intranuclear and intracytoplasm. The mature miRNA of miR-26a-1 and miR-26a-2 possesses the same sequence, with the exception of 2 different nucleotides in mature miR-26b. miR-26 appears to be a vertebrate specific microRNA and has now been predicted or experimentally validated in many vertebrate species (MIPF0000043).

== Expressions ==
miR-26 expression is induced in response to hypoxia and upregulated during smooth muscle cell (SMC) differentiation and neurogenesis. Moreover, miR-26 is consistently down-regulated in a wide range of malignant tumors, such as hepatocellular carcinoma, nasopharyngeal carcinoma, lung cancer, and breast cancer. On the contrary, miR-26a is overexpressed in high-grade glioma and cholangiocarcinoma. Elevated expression of miR-26b has been reported in pituitary tumor and bladder cancer. miR-26 is emerging as critical regulators in carcinogenesis and tumor progression by acting either as oncogenes or tumor suppressor genes in various cancers.

== miR-26a roles ==
Smooth muscle cell (SMC)
miRNA-26a is found to be significantly upregulated during SMC differentiation and downregulated in abdominal aortic aneurysm (AAA) formation. Inhibition of miRNA-26a accelerates SMC differentiation, and also promotes apoptosis, while inhibiting proliferation and migration. Overexpression of miRNA-26a blunts differentiation. MicroRNA-26a targets the expression of SMAD-1 and SMAD-4, members of the TGF-βsuperfamily signaling cascade. Inhibition of miRNA-26a increases gene expression of SMAD-1 and SMAD-4, while overexpression inhibits SMAD-1.
In the heart muscle, miRNA-26a expression is upregulated with estrogen and inversely correlated with the expression of fibrosis and inflammatory genes, suggesting a potential protective role in postmenopausal heart disease.
Hepatocellular carcinoma
miR-26a has been found to induce cell cycle arrest at the G_{1} phase in human hepatocellular carcinoma cells, in part through direct downregulation of cyclin D2 and cyclin E2. miR-26a also directly suppresses expression of estrogen receptor alpha (Erα). Overexpression of miR-26a brings about negative regulation of both cell proliferation and of the cell cycle. Therapeutic miR-26a delivery using adeno-associated virus (AAV) is able to inhibit cancer cell formation while also inducing tumour-specific apoptosis and providing dramatic protection from disease progression without toxicity.
Nasopharyngeal carcinoma
miR-26a is commonly downregulated in nasopharyngeal carcinoma samples and cell lines. It directly represses expression of the oncogene EZH2 (enhancer of zeste homolog 2), which in turn causes inhibition of cell growth and cell-cycle progression. miR-26a again suppresses tumorigenesis in nasopharyngeal cells in vivo, with suppressed expression of c-myc, cyclins D3 and E2, and cyclin-dependent kinases CDK4 and CDK6. p14^{ARF} and p21^{CIPI} CDK inhibitor expression are conversely enhanced, mediated chiefly by EZH2 expression.
Breast cancer
There is downregulation of miR-26a in breast cancer specimens and cell lines, and it has been shown to functionally antagonise human breast carcinogenesis. miR-26a directly regulates the expression of metadherin (MTDH) and EZH2. It further induces apoptosis, inhibition of colony formation and tumorigenesis of breast cancer cells in vivo. A decrease in MTDH and EZH2 expression has been shown to be accompanied by an increase in apoptosis, whilst re-expression of MTDH partially reverses miR-26a's pro-apoptotic effect.
Lung cancer
miR-26a plays an important role as an anti-oncogene in the molecular mechanism of human lung cancer. miR-26a expression is down-regulated in human lung cancer tissues relative to normal tissues. Meanwhile, the overexpression of miR-26a in the A549 human lung cancer cell line dramatically inhibits cell proliferation, blocks G1/S phase transition, induces apoptosis, and inhibits cell metastasis and invasion in vitro. Enhancer of zeste homolog 2 (EZH2) is a potential target of miR-26a.
Glioma
miR-26a might serve as an oncogene in the carcinogenesis of glioma. It has been found overexpressed in a subset of high-grade gliomas and directly targets the PTEN transcript. Overexpression of miR-26a in glioma primarily results from amplification at the miR-26a-2 locus, a genomic event strongly associated with monoallelic PTEN loss.miR-26a-mediated PTEN repression in a murine glioma model both enhances de novo tumor formation and precludes loss of heterozygosity and the PTEN locus.
Burkitt lymphoma
miR-26a plays a role as a potential tumor-suppressor in MYC-induced lymphoma. miR-26a is found to be downregulated in primary human Burkitt lymphoma and MYC-driven lymphoma cell lines. Ectopic expression of miR-26a influences cell cycle progression by targeting the bona fide oncogene EZH2 which is a polycomb protein and global regulator of gene expression. MYC modulates genes important to oncogenesis via deregulation of miRNAs, miR-26a, contributes to the MYC-driven lymphomagenesis.
Human cholangiocarcinoma
miR-26a promotes cholangiocarcinoma growth by inhibition of GSK-3β and subsequent activation of β-catenin. Human cholangiocarcinoma tissues and cell lines have increased levels of miR-26a compared with the noncancerous biliary epithelial cells. Overexpression of miR-26a increases proliferation of cholangiocarcinoma cells and colony formation in vitro, whereas miR-26 depletion reduces these parameters. Overexpression of miR-26a by cholangiocarcinoma cells increases tumor growth in severe combined immune-deficient mice. GSK-3β mRNA is a direct target of miR-26a, miR-26a-mediated reduction of GSK-3β results in activation of β-catenin and induction of several downstream genes including c-Myc, cyclinD1, and peroxisome proliferator-activated receptor δ. Depletion of β-catenin partially prevents miR-26a-induced tumor cell proliferation and colony formation.
Melanoma
miR-26a replacement is proposed as a potential therapeutic strategy for metastatic melanoma. mir-26a is strongly downregulated in melanoma cells compared with primary melanocytes. Treatment of melanoma cell lines with a miR-26a mimic promoted significant and rapid death by apoptosis. mir-26a is proposed to promote this apoptosis by repressing expression of the BAG4/Silencer of Death Domains protein (SODD) through binding the 3'UTR of SODD. [1

== miR-26b roles ==
Hypoxia
miR-26 is involved in responses to low oxygen levels and has been shown to suppress cell apoptosis in a hypoxia environment. A proposed mechanism for this is the direct targeting of proapoptotic protein BAK1 by miR-26.
Neuronal differentiation
The expression of genes which, upon activation, induce neural stem cell differentiation into neurons are suppressed by a group of phosphatases known as polymerase II carboxy-terminal domain small phosphatases (CTDSPs). Alongside other phosphatases, CTDSPs make up important components of a REST (repressor element 1 silencing transcription factor)/NRSF (neuron-restrictive silencer factor) protein complex. This REST/NRSF complex controls activation of the genes in turn responsible for control of neural stem cell differentiation. miR-26b, encoded in an intron of the CTDSP2 primary transcript, has been found to target and repress expression of CTDSP2. Mature miR-26b generation is activated during neurogenesis and there is an inactive negative feedback loop in place between miR-26b and CTDSP2 in neuronal stem cells, with inhibition of miR-26b at the precursor level.

Hepatocellular carcinoma
miR-26a/b function synergistically with their host genes, CTDSPL, CTDSP2 and CTDSP1, to block G1/S transition by activating the pRb protein in MHCC-97L, HepG2 and HuH7 liver cancer cells. Patients whose tumors have low miR-26 expression have shorter overall survival but a better response to interferon α therapy than do patients whose tumors have high expression of the microRNA.

Nasopharyngeal epithelial (CNE) cells
miR-26b is more than 38 fold downregulated in carcinoma of nasopharyngeal epithelia (CNE) cells under desferrioxamine (DFOM) induced hypoxia condition. The expression levels of miR-26b and COX-2 protein are inversely correlated in DFOM-treated CNE cells. Overexpression of miR-26b in DFOM-treated CNE cells inhibits cell proliferation through targeting COX-2.
Breast cancer
miR-26b plays a protective role in the molecular etiology of human breast cancer by promoting apoptosis. Expression of miR-26b is decreased in human breast cancer and seven human breast cancer cell lines, MCF7, HCC1937, MDA-MB-231, MDA-MB-468, MDA-MB-453, BT-549 and BT-474. Overexpression of miR-26b impairs viability and triggers apoptosis of human breast cancer MCF7 cells. SLC7A11 is identified as a direct target of miR-26b and its expression is remarkably increased in both breast cancer cell lines and clinical samples.
Colorectal cancer
The expression of miR-26b is significantly decreased in the embryonic stem cell line HUES-17s and colorectal cancer (CRC) cell line LoVo cells, compared with other three colorectal cell lines SW480, HT29 and Caco-2. Overexpression of miR-26b expression by miR-26 mimics transfection leads to the significant suppression of the cell growth and the induction of apoptosis in LoVo cells in vitro, and the inhibition of tumour growth in vivo. Four genes (TAF12, PTP4A1, CHFR and ALS2CR2) with intersection are the targets of miR-26b. The regulatory pathways of miR-26b are significantly associated with the invasiveness and metastasis of CRC cells.
Glioma
miR-26b may act as a tumor suppressor in glioma. Low level expression of miR-26b has been found in glioma cells. The level of miR-26b is inversely correlated with the grade of glioma. EphA2 is a direct target of miR-26b. Over-expression of miR-26b in glioma cells represses the endogenous level of EphA2 protein. Ectopic expression of miR-26b inhibits the proliferation, migration, invasion and vasculogenic mimicry of human glioma cells.
Growth-hormone (GH)-producing pituitary tumors
miR-26b has been found to directly target and regulate the expression of the PTEN tumour suppressor gene, mutations of which lead to activation of a PI3K/AKT signalling pathway, increased cell survival and an onset of oncogenesis. The regulation of PTEN by miR-26b sees direct effects of miR-26b on pituitary cell tumour behaviour, with miR-26b inhibition suppressing pituitary tumour growth in xenografts. Another microRNA, miR-128 microRNA precursor|miR-128, regulates expression of a BMI1 gene which suppresses PTEN expression levels by binding to its promoter region. Inhibition of miR-26b expression alongside upregulation of miR-128 suppresses the colony-forming ability and invasiveness of pituitary tumour cells.
