= 23S rRNA (adenine2503-C2)-methyltransferase =

Class of enzymes

23S rRNA (adenine^{2503}-C^{2})-methyltransferase

Identifiers
- EC no.: 2.1.1.192

Databases
- IntEnz: IntEnz view
- BRENDA: BRENDA entry
- ExPASy: NiceZyme view
- KEGG: KEGG entry
- MetaCyc: metabolic pathway
- PRIAM: profile
- PDB structures: RCSB PDB PDBe PDBsum
Search
- PMC: articles
- PubMed: articles
- NCBI: proteins

23S rRNA (adenine^{2503}-C^{2})-methyltransferase (EC 2.1.1.192, RlmN, YfgB, Cfr) is an enzyme with systematic name S-adenosyl-L-methionine:23S rRNA (adenine^{2503}-C^{2})-methyltransferase. This enzyme catalyses the following chemical reaction

2 S-adenosyl-L-methionine + adenine^{2503} in 23S rRNA $\rightleftharpoons$ ^{S-adenosyl-L-homocysteine} + L-methionine + 5'-deoxyadenosine + 2-methyladenine^{2503} in 23S rRNA

23S rRNA (adenine^{2503}-C^{2})-methyltransferase contains an [4Fe-4S] cluster.
