= 23S rRNA (adenine2503-C2,C8)-dimethyltransferase =

Obsolete enzyme family

23S rRNA (adenine^{2503}-C^{2},C^{8})-dimethyltransferase

Identifiers
- EC no.: 2.1.1.194
- CAS no.: 39369-30-7

Databases
- IntEnz: IntEnz view
- BRENDA: BRENDA entry
- ExPASy: NiceZyme view
- KEGG: KEGG entry
- MetaCyc: metabolic pathway
- PRIAM: profile
- PDB structures: RCSB PDB PDBe PDBsum
Search
- PMC: articles
- PubMed: articles
- NCBI: proteins

23S rRNA (adenine^{2503}-C^{2},C^{8})-dimethyltransferase (EC 2.1.1.194, Cfr, Cfr methyltransferase, Cfr rRNA methyltransferase) is an enzyme with systematic name S-adenosyl-L-methionine:23S rRNA (adenine^{2503}-C^{2},C^{8})-dimethyltransferase. This enzyme catalyses the following chemical reaction

2 S-adenosyl-L-methionine + adenine^{2503} in 23S rRNA $\rightleftharpoons$ 2 S-adenosyl-L-homocysteine + 2,8-dimethyladenine^{2503} in 23S rRNA

This enzyme contains an [4Fe-S] cluster.
