= Mental stress-induced myocardial ischemia =

- Specialty: Cardiology, behavioral medicine
- Symptoms: Most commonly asymptomatic (silent) and not accompanied by angina or chest pain.
- Complications: Increased risk of myocardial infarction and cardiovascular death
- Causes: Inadequate blood supply to cardiac muscle resuting from hemodynamic, neuroendocrine, and immune responses to acute psychological stress.
- Risk factors: presence of either obstructive or non-obstuctive coronary artery disease
- Diagnostic method: Cardiac imaging of myocardial perfusion or wall-motion during a standardized mental stress task
- Treatment: Not yet established.
- Frequency: About one-third of patients with coronary artery disease. Varies with patient population, stressor, and imaging method. Reported ranges vary widely between 15–70% of coronary artery disease patients.

Mental stress-induced myocardial ischemia (MSIMI) is a medical condition in which acute psychological stress can trigger a transient myocardial ischemia, a condition of reduced blood flow to the heart muscle. Among individuals with coronary artery disease, mental stress-induced ischemia is associated with increased risk of future adverse cardiovascular events (such as heart attack or sudden cardiac death) compared to those without MSIMI. The prevalence of MSIMI varies widely between 15-70% depending on the patient population studied, the mental stressor used in testing, and imaging method used to measure ischemia. MSIMI is somewhat more common among individuals with ischemia during conventional exercise or pharmacologic testing and among individuals with obstructive coronary artery disease. However, it also occurs in a patients without obstructive coronary disease and with no evidence of ischemia on conventional testing.

Mental stress triggers various physiological changes in the body, activating mechanisms such as the autonomic nervous system (ANS) and the hypothalamic–pituitary–adrenal axis (HPA), resulting in hemodynamic, neuroendocrine, and immune responses. Typically, these responses are adaptive and help individuals cope with environmental changes, referred to as the "defense response," which prepares them for fight or flight. Consequently, the risk of cardiovascular (CV) events resulting from mental stress is influenced by external factors and an individual's stress threshold, which is shaped by genetic predispositions and life experiences. This variability explains why people respond differently to stressors.

Mental stress-induced myocardial ischemia involves abnormal microvascular vasoreactivity and inflammation, with increased brain activity in regions that modulate autonomic nervous system reactivity to emotional stress, fear. Emotional responses and certain psychological traits may influence the occurrence of MSIMI. MSIMI can occur at lower cardiac workloads, independent of hemodynamic changes, and is not directly related to the severity of angiographic CHD. It can occur in patients with normal cardiac stress testing and can often be silent.

== Clinical significance ==
MSIMI is associated with a twofold increased risk of major adverse cardiovascular events (MACE) compared to those without MSIMI. It is particularly prevalent among young women with myocardial infarction (MI) and those with psychological comorbidities.

Studies have found that young women who have had a myocardial infarction are twice as likely to develop mental stress-induced myocardial ischemia (MSIMI) compared to men of similar age.

== Diagnostics ==
Various techniques like electrocardiogram (ECG), echocardiography, single-photon emission computed tomography (SPECT), and positron emission tomography (PET) are used to assess MSIMI. The incidence of MSIMI has varied across studies due to different assessment methods and mental stressors.

== Treatment ==
Current research focuses on understanding stress pathways in CAD and integrating mental health, behavioral medicine with routine cardiology care to improve patient outcomes.

== Epidemiology ==
Approximately 30% of CAD patients experience MSIMI under mental stress, which typically is silent and not related to the severity of CAD.

== See also ==
- Endothelial dysfunction
