= Nieca Goldberg =

American cardiologist, executive, academic, and author

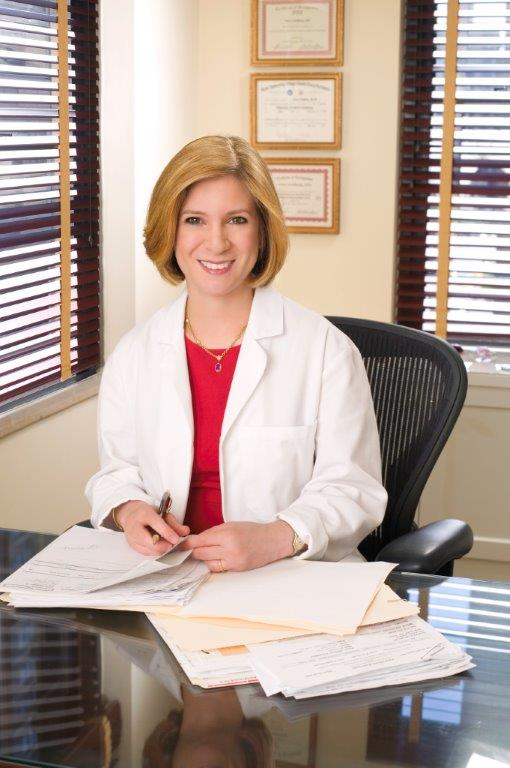
Nieca Goldberg (2017)

Nieca Goldberg (born October 21, 1957) is an American physician and author. Her specialty is as a cardiologist. The American College of Cardiology describes Goldberg as a "clinical innovator" and "a nationally recognized pioneer in women’s heart health".

== Early life and education ==
Goldberg decided to become a cardiologist because her father suffered from heart disease while she was in high school. Goldberg is a graduate of Barnard College and SUNY Downstate Medical Center. She did her medical residency at St. Luke’s-Roosevelt Hospital Center and a cardiology fellowship at SUNY Downstate. During her time in medical school, she was dismayed to find out that "all medical care was based on what was normal for a 165-pound man".

== Career ==
Goldberg is the Medical Director at the Joan H. Tisch Center for Women’s Health at the NYU Langone Medical Center which opened in 2011. Goldberg was previously Chief of the Women’s Heart Program at Lenox Hill Hospital which at the time was the first program of its kind in New York City. She was the founder of Total Heart Care in New York, which focuses on women's health care. Goldberg is a Clinical Associate Professor of Medicine at the NYU School of Medicine.

== Advocate for women’s heart health ==
During Goldberg's early training as a doctor, she observed that many women were not being properly diagnosed in regards to heart diseases. Goldberg also discusses how women often neglect their own health in favor of focusing on their family's health issues.

Goldberg is a national spokesperson for the American Heart Association and has been in the forefront of the AHA "Go Red for Women" campaign. Goldberg’s involvement as a leadership volunteer with not-for profit organizations concerned with women’s health also includes: co-medical director of the 92nd Street Y Cardio Rehab Program, membership on the Board of Directors of the Society for Women’s Health Research (2015–Present) and as a member of the Woman’s Day Editorial Advisory Board.

Goldberg was part of General Mills’ cereal promotion that featured her likeness with a public service message on 3,000,000 boxes of Wheat Chex and MultiGrain Chex in 2004. She has also been recognized by the American Heart Association’s "Dr. with Heart Award", Woman’s Day magazine’s "Red Dress Award" in 2005, Jewish Women International’s "Women to Watch" Award, and "The Women at Heart" 2006 Honoree Award from the Links Greater New York Chapter.

== Writing ==
Goldberg wrote Women are Not Small Men: Life-Saving Strategies for Preventing and Healing Heart Disease in Women in order to combat misinformation and ignorance about women's cardiovascular health. It was updated later and retitled The Women’s Healthy Heart Program – Lifesaving Strategies for Preventing and Healing Heart Disease.

She is also the author of Dr. Nieca Goldberg’s Complete Guide to Women’s Health.
