= Major adverse cardiovascular events =

Concept used in cardiovascular research

Major adverse cardiovascular events (MACE, or major adverse cardiac events) is a composite endpoint frequently used in cardiovascular research. Despite widespread use of the term in clinical trials, the definitions of MACE can differ, which makes comparison of similar studies difficult.

== Definition ==
The so-called "classical 3-point MACE" is defined as a composite of nonfatal stroke, nonfatal myocardial infarction, and cardiovascular death. Another study similarly defined MACE as a composite of nonfatal stroke, nonfatal acute coronary syndrome, and death from vascular causes. But another study defines MACE as "CVD events, admission for HF (heart failure), ischemic cardiovascular [CV] events, cardiac death". Yet another study defined MACE as "CV death, hospitalization for HF, or myocardial infarction (MI)".

The heterogeneity of the sets defining MACE, hampering systematic reviews and meta-analyses, has been repeatedly criticized.

== Risk factors for MACE ==
Which conditions are risk factors for MACE depends on some characteristics of the investigated cohort. Established risk indicators in the general population include age, pre-existing cardiovascular disease, smoking, diabetes mellitus, elevated concentrations of triglycerides and non-HDL cholesterol concentration, reduced HDL concentration and hypertension, as, e. g., demonstrated by the Framingham Heart Study. More recently, additional risk indicators have been identified, e. g. type 2 allostatic load, high-sensitivity C-reactive protein, d-dimer level, renal failure, consumption of salt as sodium chloride, and altered thyroid function.

== Therapeutic interventions ==
Two reviews have concluded that SGLT2 inhibitors benefit patients with atherosclerotic MACE. One of those studies defined MACE as the composite of myocardial infarction, stroke, or cardiovascular death. Other studies have shown MACE to be potently predicted by levels of ceramide found in patients.
