= Microvascular angina =

- Other names: cardiac syndrome X, coronary microvascular dysfunction (CMD), microvascular coronary disease
- Specialty: Cardiology

Microvascular angina (MVA), previously known as cardiac syndrome X, also known as coronary microvascular dysfunction (CMD) or microvascular coronary disease is a type of angina (chest pain) with signs associated with decreased blood flow to heart tissue but with normal coronary arteries.

The use of the term cardiac syndrome X (CSX) can lead to the lack of appreciation of how microvascular angina is a debilitating heart related pain condition with the increased risk of heart attack and other heart problems.

Some studies have found an increased risk of other vasospastic disorders in cardiac microvascular angina patients, such as migraine and Raynaud's phenomenon. Treatment typically involves beta-blockers, such as metoprolol, however beta blockers can make coronary spasms worse.

Microvascular angina is a separate condition from variant angina.

== Signs and symptoms ==
Patients often experience myocardial ischemia symptoms, such as heaviness, tightness, pressure or squeezing in the chest area, which can also include sweating, nausea, shortness of breath (dyspnea), fatigue.

While there is no formal definition of microvascular angina, the general consensus is that it entails all of the following:

- Angina: This usually does not cause dysfunction on echocardiogram and can last longer than that of heart disease.
- Abnormal cardiac stress test: ST segment changes in EKG are typically similar to those of coronary artery disease, and the opposite of those of Prinzmetal's angina. Myocardial perfusion imaging can be abnormal in 30% of patients.
- Coronary angiogram: Normal
- Other causes of chest pain must be ruled out, including:
  - Variant angina / Coronary artery spasm.
  - Esophageal spasm

== Causes ==
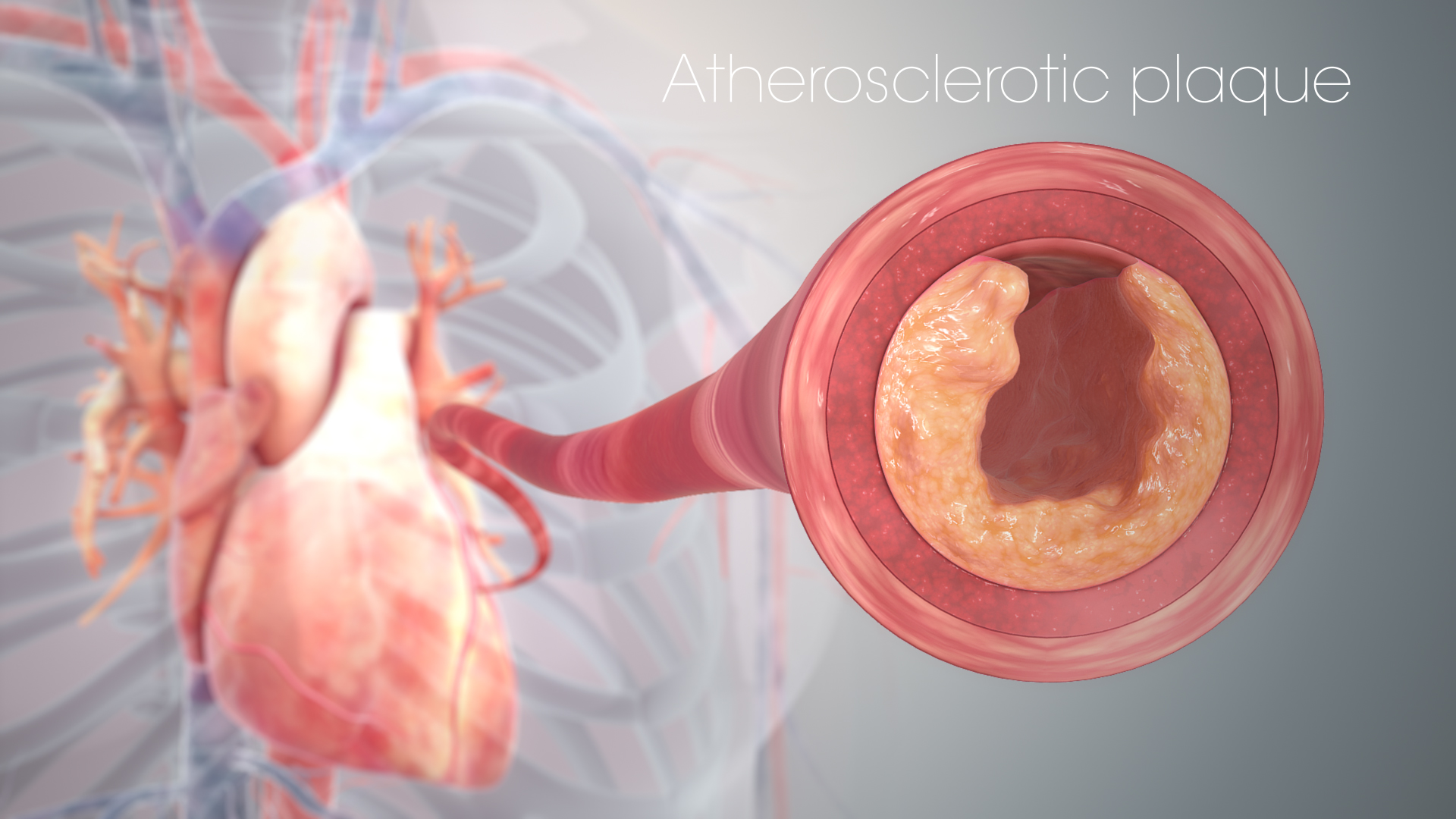
Narrowing of the artery due to plaque formation.

There is no specific known cause for microvascular angina but rather a multitude of risk factors that act together. It is believed that the lack of blood flow caused by a microvascular disease and enhanced pain perception are two of the factors that may cause it. The microvascular dysfunctions refer to the abnormalities in the very small blood vessels of the heart. The narrowing of these vessels may lead to lack of oxygen in specific areas of the cardiac muscle causing chest pain. Several studies have shown that patients living with microvascular angina may have an enhanced pain perception, and usually feel more intense chest pain than individuals without microvascular angina.

The risk factors include abdominal obesity, meaning excessive visceral fat tissue in and around the abdomen, atherogenic dyslipidemia which is a blood fat disorder, and elevated blood pressure. Other risk factors are insulin resistance or intolerance to glucose, prothrombotic state or proinflammatory state. Older people are more at risk to develop this condition, and there is some evidence that suggests that there are genetic mutations that predispose to the syndrome. Women are more prone to this condition than men, as well as those who have a history of heart disease in the family.

== Pathophysiology ==
This condition is typically characterized by a series of structural and functional changes within the heart's microcirculation, such as endothelial dysfunction (which affects the inner lining of blood vessels), microvascular arteriolar remodeling (changes in the vessel structure) such as intimal thickening, smooth muscle cell proliferation, perivascular fibrosis, and increased microvascular resistance (which impedes blood flow). There are also differences in coronary blood flow reserve (the capacity to increase blood flow during increased demand) and IMR (index of microcirculatory resistance).

In a large percentage of patients, there is a finding of systemic microvascular abnormalities, causing reduced blood flow in the microvasculature of the cardiac muscles. When the blood vessels constrict and fail to dilate there is decreased oxygen levels to the cardiac muscles resulting in hypoxia which lead to chest pain.

While numerous physiological mechanisms have been proposed, none have been proven.

== Types of microvascular dysfunction ==
=== Structural endotype ===
Patients with the structural coronary microvascular dysfunction endotype (inability to dilate) tend to have a high vascular tone at rest and high vascular tone at stress. Patients with this endotype typically show normal CBF (coronary blood flow) at rest, lower stress CBF, lower coronary flow reserve (CFR) and elevated hyperemic index of microcirculatory resistance (hMR). Their microvascular resistance and endothelial dysfunction is elevated.

It is characterized by luminal obstruction, vascular-wall infiltration, vascular remodeling, perivascular fibrosis and capillary rarefaction.

In this type individuals may have impaired vasodilatory capacity and endothelial function, leading to reduced coronary blood flow and compromised myocardial perfusion, especially during stress or increased demand.

=== Functional endotype ===
Functional coronary microvascular dysfunction endotype (exhausted dilatory capacity) presents a low vascular tone at rest and low vascular tone at stress. Individuals often display elevated rest CBF, normal stress CBF, lower CFR and normal hMR, normal microvascular resistance and higher nitric oxide synthase (NOS) activity. It is characterized by endothelial dysfunction, smooth-muscle dysfunction and autonomic dysfunction. Endothelial function and vasodilatory capacity is relatively preserved resulting in adequate myocardial perfusion under resting conditions.

== Diagnosis ==
Microvascular angina is a diagnosis of exclusion. Typically this will necessitate both a clinical diagnosis, appropriate stress testing, and a coronary angiogram that meet the above criteria. Cardiac MRI can be used to diagnose microvascular angina. Studies are ongoing to validate this approach.

There is growing evidence that microvascular angina is caused by a functional disorder of the microvessels, coronary microvascular dysfunction (CMD). Blood vessels either fail to dilate or constrict in response to various stressors such as exercise, the cold or emotional stress.

An angiogram with acetylcholine can demonstrate microvascular dysfunction which can affect the microvessels and larger coronary arteries leading to either microvascular angina or coronary artery spasms (Prinzmetal's angina). These are considered discrete conditions though some individuals can be affected by both.

Microvascular angina can be diagnosed using different tests and exams, but it is mainly a diagnosis of exclusion. However, sedentary and overweight individuals with a family history of type 2 diabetes should be tested regularly to determine whether they have irregular levels of glucose or lipids, or blood pressure abnormalities, factors which are usually associated with microvascular angina. A first test to be taken is an exercise stress test which shows if the heart is not getting blood during exertion.

Angiograms may be useful and conclusive when microvascular angina they offer a detailed image of the heart. However, they cannot detect potential abnormalities in the small arteries, and the doctor may ask for more tests in order to rule out other heart conditions, such as Prinzmetal's angina (variant/vasospastic angina, coronary artery spasm) which has similar symptoms.

=== Differential diagnosis ===
Chest pain caused by microvascular angina is most of the time unpredictable and it can occur when at rest and/or during exercise. The pain associated with microvascular angina is normally more intense and it lasts for longer periods of time compared to pain caused by other conditions.

Many gastric conditions can cause chest pains (sub-sternal pain), while this is usually associated with consumption of food this is not always the case, and is a very common differential diagnosis.

For example, a stable angina causes chest pain that goes away when at rest. Another difference is that while chest pain caused by any type of stable angina is relieved with nitroglycerin, this drug is not effective in most patients with microvascular angina.

== Treatment ==
- Calcium channel blockers - specifically nifedipine and diltiazem can be effective.
- Beta blockers - also work. Can make coronary spasms worse.
- Aminophylline - may work by inhibiting adenosine receptors.
- Estrogen - may work in women.
- L-Arginine - increases release of NO at vascular level, thus leading to vasodilatory effect.
- Ranolazine - shown to improve angina and myocardial ischemia.
- Statins
- Aspirin
- Clopidogrel
- ACE inhibitors and ARBs
- Lifestyle changes such as diet and exercise.
- Pain management through cognitive behavioral therapy (CBT), mindfulness meditation, yoga and Tai Chi.

Microvascular angina is a chronic long term condition which increases the risk of heart attack and other cardiac events such as heart failure and frequent hospital admissions. The treatment consists of drugs, mainly to relieve chest pain, but a very important part of the treatment is regularly visiting the doctor and repeating the tests to make sure the condition was taken care of in full.

The first step in managing Microvascular angina is the administration of nitrates which may relieve the chest pain. They are used because of their ability to relax the muscles of the heart and blood vessels. However, they prove to be inefficient in as many as half of patients. Alternative treatments may consist of calcium channel blockers or beta blockers which reduce chest pain by relaxing the muscle cells lining the artery and improving blood flow to the heart while lowering blood pressure. Aminophylline may also work, while estrogen can be effective in women.

There is at present no known cure however a change in lifestyle is important. Patients should start following healthier diets which are low in saturated fats, and should participate in regular physical activities. However, any patient with a heart disease condition should first seek for a medical opinion before starting exercising. Quitting smoking is also highly recommended.

== Incidence ==
The reasons why women are more prone than men to develop a Microvascular angina are still not clear. However, hormonal factors along with other risk factors unique to women may play an important role. The constant changing of the estrogen levels may be one of the reasons along with the changes brought by birth.

== History ==
Microvascular angina was first described by H. G. Kemp in 1973 as angina-like chest pain in the absence of angiographic evidence of coronary obstruction.

== See also ==
- Takotsubo cardiomyopathy
- Mental stress-induced myocardial ischemia
- Endothelial dysfunction
