= Coronary flow reserve =

Maximum increase in blood flow through coronary arteries above the normal resting volume

Coronary flow reserve (CFR) is the maximum increase in blood flow through the coronary arteries above the normal resting volume. Its measurement is often used in medicine to assist in the treatment of conditions affecting the coronary arteries and to determine the efficacy of treatments used.

== Overview ==
When demand for oxygen in the myocardium is increased, the vascular resistance of the coronary arteries has the ability to reduce, and this can increase the volume of blood passing through the blood vessels. This reduction occurs because the arteries dilate, which causes an increase in the diameter of the lumen. The greatest potential for this change is normally in the branches (arterioles) of the coronary artery that penetrate the myocardium, rather than those on the surface of the heart.

== Measurement ==
Coronary flow reserve can be measured through a variety of methods, including digital subtraction cineangiography with coronary catheterization, doppler echocardiography, and positron emission tomography (PET).

== Medical implications ==
Coronary flow reserve is used in diagnostics and treatment of patients with conditions such as coronary artery disease and syndrome X. In the treatment of these conditions, vasodilators are used to allow sufficient blood to flow past a stenosis, for example, and the measurement of CFR enables the efficacy of such interventions to be measured. In patients with Anderson-Fabry disease, there is evidence to suggest that CFR can be reduced. When coronary flow reserve is used in medicine, it is often expressed with a numerical value, which is formed by dividing the maximal coronary blood flow by resting blood flow. This allows for an objective view, which can aid diagnosis and treatment.

== See also ==
- Coronary artery
- Coronary circulation
