= Congenital heart defect =

Defect in the structure of the heart that is present at birth

- Other names: Congenital heart anomaly, congenital heart disease
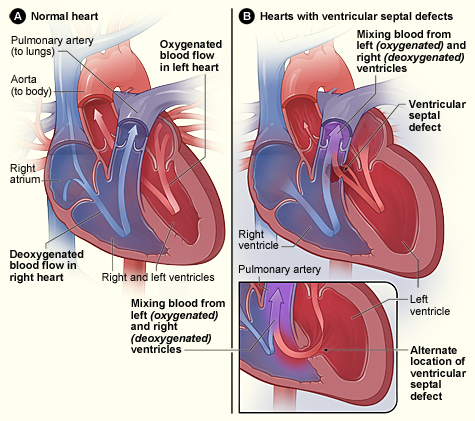
- The normal structure of the heart (left) in comparison to two common locations for a ventricular septal defect (right), the most common form of congenital heart defect
- Specialty: Cardiology
- Symptoms: Rapid breathing, bluish skin, poor weight gain, feeling tired
- Complications: Heart failure
- Types: Cyanotic heart defects, non-cyanotic heart defects
- Causes: Often unknown
- Risk factors: Rubella infection during pregnancy, alcohol or tobacco, parents being closely related, poor nutritional status, taking antidepressant during pregnancy or obesity in the mother
- Treatment: None, catheter based procedures, heart surgery, heart transplantation
- Prognosis: Generally good (with treatment)
- Frequency: 48.9 million (2015)
- Deaths: 261,247 (2017)

A congenital heart defect (CHD), also known as a congenital heart anomaly, congenital cardiovascular malformation, and congenital heart disease, is a defect in the structure of the heart or great vessels that is present at birth. A congenital heart defect is classed as a cardiovascular disease. Signs and symptoms depend on the specific type of defect. Symptoms can vary from none to life-threatening. When present, symptoms are variable and may include rapid breathing, bluish skin (cyanosis), poor weight gain, and feeling tired. CHD does not cause chest pain. Most congenital heart defects are not associated with other diseases. A complication of CHD is heart failure. Due to recent advances in the management of patients with CHD, an increased number of patients may develop heart failure and might even require heart transplantation in future.

Congenital heart defects are the most common birth defect. In 2015, they were present in 48.9 million people globally. They affect between 4 and 75 per 1,000 live births, depending upon how they are diagnosed. In about 6 to 19 per 1,000 they cause a moderate to severe degree of problems. Congenital heart defects are the leading cause of birth defect-related deaths: in 2015, they resulted in 303,300 deaths, down from 366,000 deaths in 1990.

The cause of a congenital heart defect is often unknown. Risk factors include certain infections during pregnancy such as rubella, use of certain medications or drugs such as alcohol or tobacco, parents being closely related, or poor nutritional status or obesity in the mother. Having a parent with a congenital heart defect is also a risk factor. A number of genetic conditions are associated with heart defects, including Down syndrome, Turner syndrome, and Marfan syndrome. Congenital heart defects are divided into two main groups: cyanotic heart defects and non-cyanotic heart defects, depending on whether the child has the potential to turn bluish in color. The defects may involve the interior walls of the heart, the heart valves, or the large blood vessels that lead to and from the heart.

Congenital heart defects are partly preventable through rubella vaccination, the adding of iodine to salt, and the adding of folic acid to certain food products. Some defects do not need treatment. Others may be effectively treated with catheter based procedures or heart surgery. Occasionally a number of operations may be needed, or a heart transplant may be required. With appropriate treatment, outcomes are generally good, even with complex problems.

== Signs and symptoms ==
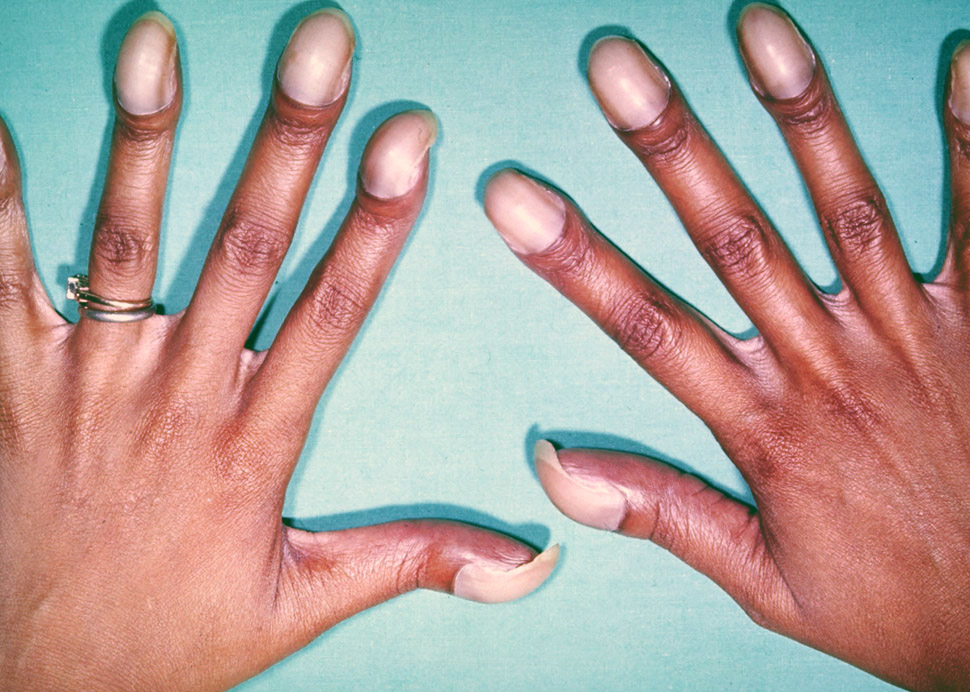
Digital clubbing with cyanotic nail beds in an adult with tetralogy of Fallot

Signs and symptoms are related to type and severity of the heart defect. Symptoms frequently present early in life, but it is possible for some CHDs to go undetected throughout life. Some children have no signs while others may exhibit shortness of breath, cyanosis, fainting, heart murmur, under-development of limbs and muscles, poor feeding or growth, or respiratory infections. Congenital heart defects cause abnormal heart structure resulting in production of certain sounds called heart murmur. These can sometimes be detected by auscultation; however, not all heart murmurs are caused by congenital heart defects.

=== Associated conditions ===
Congenital heart defects are associated with an increased incidence of seven other specific medical conditions, together being called the VACTERL association:

- V – Vertebral anomalies
- A – Anal atresia
- C – Cardiovascular anomalies
- T – Tracheoesophageal fistula
- E – Esophageal atresia
- R – Renal (kidney) or radial anomalies
- L – Limb defects

Ventricular septal defect (VSD), atrial septal defect (ASD), and tetralogy of Fallot (ToF) are the most common congenital heart defects seen in the VACTERL association. Less common defects in the association are persistent truncus arteriosus and transposition of the great arteries.

== Causes ==
The cause of congenital heart disease may be genetic, environmental, or a combination of both.

=== Genetic ===
Genetic mutations, often sporadic, represent the largest known cause of congenital heart defects. They are described in the table below.

Genetic lesions	Attributable percent	Examples	Primary genetic testing method
Aneuploidies	5–8%	Survivable autosomal trisomies (chromosomes 13, 18, 21), chromosome X monosomy (Turner syndrome)	Karyotyping
Copy number variants	10–12%	22q11.2 deletion/duplication (velocardiofacial/DiGeorge syndrome), 1q21.1 deletion/duplication, 8p23.1 deletion/duplication, 15q11.2 deletion (Burnside-Butler syndrome)	Array comparative genomic hybridization (also known as chromosomal microarray analysis)
Inherited protein-coding single nucleotide variant (SNV) or small insertion/deletion (indel)	3–5%	Holt–Oram syndrome, Noonan syndrome, Alagille syndrome	Gene panel
De novo protein-coding SNV or indel	~10%	Mutations in genes highly expressed during heart development	Whole exome sequencing

==== Molecular pathways ====
The genes regulating the complex developmental sequence have only been partly elucidated. Some genes are associated with specific defects. A number of genes have been associated with cardiac manifestations. Mutations of a heart muscle protein, α-myosin heavy chain (MYH6) are associated with atrial septal defects. Several proteins that interact with MYH6 are also associated with cardiac defects. The transcription factor GATA4 forms a complex with the TBX5 which interacts with MYH6. Another factor, the homeobox (developmental) gene, NKX2-5 also interacts with MYH6. Mutations of all these proteins are associated with both atrial and ventricular septal defects; In addition, NKX2-5 is associated with defects in the electrical conduction of the heart and TBX5 is related to the Holt–Oram syndrome which includes electrical conduction defects and abnormalities of the upper limb. The Wnt signaling co-factors BCL9, BCL9L and PYGO might be part of these molecular pathways, as when their genes are mutated, this causes phenotypes similar to the features present in Holt-Oram syndrome. Another T-box gene, TBX1, is involved in velo-cardio-facial syndrome DiGeorge syndrome, the most common deletion which has extensive symptoms including defects of the cardiac outflow tract including tetralogy of Fallot.

Examples of gene products and associated features
	MYH6	GATA4	NKX2-5	TBX5	TBX1
Locus	14q11.2-q13	8p23.1-p22	5q34	12q24.1	22q11.2
Syndrome				Holt–Oram	DiGeorge
Atrial septal defects	✔	✔	✔	✔	
Ventricular septal defects		✔	✔	✔	
Electrical conduction abnormalities			✔	✔	
Outflow tract abnormalities					✔
Non-cardiac manifestations				Upper limb abnormalities	Small or absent thymus Small or absent parathyroids Facial abnormalities

The notch signaling pathway, a regulatory mechanism for cell growth and differentiation, plays broad roles in several aspects of cardiac development. Notch elements are involved in determination of the right and left sides of the body plan, so the directional folding of the heart tube can be impacted. Notch signaling is involved early in the formation of the endocardial cushions and continues to be active as the develop into the septa and valves. It is also involved in the development of the ventricular wall and the connection of the outflow tract to the great vessels. Mutations in the gene for one of the notch ligands, Jagged1, are identified in the majority of examined cases of arteriohepatic dysplasia (Alagille syndrome), characterized by defects of the great vessels (pulmonary artery stenosis), heart (tetralogy of Fallot in 13% of cases), liver, eyes, face, and bones. Though less than 1% of all cases, where no defects are found in the Jagged1 gene, defects are found in Notch2 gene. In 10% of cases, no mutation is found in either gene. For another member of the gene family, mutations in the Notch1 gene are associated with bicuspid aortic valve, a valve with two leaflets instead of three. Notch1 is also associated with calcification of the aortic valve, the third most common cause of heart disease in adults.

Mutations of a cell regulatory mechanism, the Ras/MAPK pathway are responsible for a variety of syndromes, including Noonan syndrome, LEOPARD syndrome, Costello syndrome and cardiofaciocutaneous syndrome in which there is cardiac involvement. While the conditions listed are known genetic causes, there are likely many other genes which are more subtle. It is known that the risk for congenital heart defects is higher when there is a close relative with one.

=== Environmental ===
Known environmental factors include certain infections during pregnancy such as rubella, drugs (alcohol, hydantoin, lithium and thalidomide) and maternal illness (diabetes mellitus, phenylketonuria, and systemic lupus erythematosus). Alcohol exposure in the father also appears to increase the risk of congenital heart defects.

Being overweight or obese increases the risk of congenital heart disease. Additionally, as maternal obesity increases, the risk of heart defects also increases. A distinct physiological mechanism has not been identified to explain the link between maternal obesity and CHD, but both pre-pregnancy folate deficiency and diabetes have been implicated in some studies.

=== Twins and multiple births ===
Congenital heart defects happen more often in twins than in single babies. Monochorionic twins, who share a placenta, have a greater risk of these heart defects compared to dichorionic twins, who have their own placentas. A systematic review and meta-analysis of four studies conducted in 2007 showed a 9-fold increase in CHD risk in MC twins compared to singletons.

== Mechanism ==
There is a complex sequence of events that result in a well formed heart at birth and disruption of any portion may result in a defect. The orderly timing of cell growth, cell migration, and programmed cell death ("apoptosis") has been studied extensively and the genes that control the process are being elucidated. Around day 15 of development, the cells that will become the heart exist in two horseshoe shaped bands of the middle tissue layer (mesoderm), and some cells migrate from a portion of the outer layer (ectoderm), the neural crest, which is the source of a variety of cells found throughout the body. On day 19 of development, a pair of vascular elements, the "endocardial tubes", form. The tubes fuse when cells between then undergo programmed death and cells from the first heart field migrate to the tube, and form a ring of heart cells (myocytes) around it by day 21. On day 22, the heart begins to beat and by day 24, blood is circulating.

At day 22, the circulatory system is bilaterally symmetrical with paired vessels on each side and the heart consisting of a simple tube located in the midline of the body layout. The portions that will become the atria and will be located closest to the head are the most distant from the head. From days 23 through 28, the heart tube folds and twists, with the future ventricles moving left of center (the ultimate location of the heart) and the atria moving towards the head.

On day 28, areas of tissue in the heart tube begin to expand inwards; after about two weeks, these expansions (the membranous "septum primum" and the muscular "endocardial cushions") fuse to form the four chambers of the heart. A failure to fuse properly will result in a defect that may allow blood to leak between chambers. After this happens, cells that have migrated from the neural crest begin to divide the bulbus cordis. The main outflow tract is divided in two by the growth of a spiraling septum, becoming the great vessels—the ascending segment of the aorta and the pulmonary trunk. If the separation is incomplete, the result is a "persistent truncus arteriosus". The vessels may be reversed ("transposition of the great vessels"). The two halves of the split tract must migrate into the correct positions over the appropriate ventricles. A failure may result in some blood flowing into the wrong vessel (e.g. overriding aorta). The four-chambered heart and the great vessels have features required for fetal growth. The lungs are unexpanded and cannot accommodate the full circulatory volume. Two structures exist to shunt blood flow away from the lungs to compensate. Cells in part of the septum primum die, creating a hole while new muscle cells (the "septum secundum") grow along the right atrial side of the septum primum except for one region, leaving a gap through which blood can pass from the right atrium to the left atrium (the foramen ovale). A small vessel called the ductus arteriosus allows blood from the pulmonary artery to pass to the aorta.

=== Changes at birth ===
The ductus arteriosus stays open because of circulating factors including prostaglandins. The foramen ovale stays open because of the flow of blood from the right atrium to the left atrium. As the lungs expand, blood flows easily through the lungs and the membranous portion of the foramen ovale (the septum primum) flops over the muscular portion (the septum secundum). If the closure is incomplete, the result is a patent foramen ovale. The two flaps may fuse, but many adults have a foramen ovale that stays closed only because of the pressure difference between the atria.

=== Theories ===
Rokitansky (1875) explained congenital heart defects as breaks in heart development at various ontogenesis stages. Spitzer (1923) treats them as returns to one of the phylogenesis stages. Krimski (1963), synthesizing two previous points of view, considered congenital heart diseases as a stop of development at the certain stage of ontogenesis, corresponding to this or that stage of the phylogenesis. Hence, these theories can explain feminine and neutral types of defects only.

== Diagnosis ==
Many congenital heart defects can be diagnosed prenatally by fetal echocardiography. This is a test which can be done during the second trimester of pregnancy, when the woman is about 18–24 weeks pregnant. It can be an abdominal ultrasound or transvaginal ultrasound.

If a baby is born with cyanotic heart disease, the diagnosis is usually made shortly after birth due to the blue colour of their skin (called cyanosis).

If a baby is born with a septal defect or an obstruction defect, often their symptoms are only noticeable after several months, or sometimes even after many years.

Guidance for clinicians on how to review an infant with suspected critical congenital heart disease has been published.

=== Newborn screening and early detection ===
Early detection of critical congenital heart disease (CCHD) in patients with CHD is important for reducing morbidity and mortality, as it allows for timely treatment and may help prevent future complications. Despite the use of standard screening tests such as prenatal ultrasound and physical examination, many cases of CCHD are missed during initial evaluation. The addition of postnatal screening using pulse oximetry has become an important component of detecting CCHD in newborns. Pulse oximetry is a non-invasive and reliable method that measures oxygen levels in the blood. This test can help detect hypoxemia (low blood oxygen levels), which may indicate the presence of CCHD.

Pulse oximetry screening is typically performed at or after 24 hours of life, or earlier if the newborn is being discharged and after discontinuation of supplemental oxygen. The pulse oximeter is placed on the right hand and one foot to obtain oxygen saturation measurements. During this initial screen, an oxygen saturation below 90% in the right hand or foot is considered a failed screen. A passing screen is defined as an oxygen saturation of 95% or greater in the right hand and foot, with a difference between the two of 3% or less. A retest is indicated when either there is a reading between 90 and 94% oxygen saturation in the right hand or foot or a greater than 4% difference in saturation between them. The retest is performed 1 hour later, following the same protocol as the initial screen, and is considered passing if it meets the same criteria as the initial screen but considered a fail if it does not. After a failed screen, further workup is indicated, which may include an echocardiogram and a cardiac clinical assessment. For a simple diagram of the full algorithm reflecting the most recent recommendations from the American Academy of Pediatrics, see Oster et al., 2025.

Implementation of pulse oximetry screenings at the state level has been associated with reductions in emergency hospitalizations related to CCHD and infant mortality as well as a reported decrease in early cardiac deaths. The use of these screening strategies has not been shown to significantly increase resource utilization or cost. In addition to detecting conditions associated with CCHD, such as coarctation of the aorta and pulmonary atresia, pulse oximetry may also detect conditions associated with hypoxemia, such as sepsis or pneumonia. This screening test does have its limitations including but not limited to the possibility of false positive results and the inability to detect all forms of CHD. For this reason, pulse oximetry is important to use alongside existing standard screening procedures to improve early detection and clinical outcomes.

=== Classification ===
A number of classification systems exist for congenital heart defects. In 2000 the International Congenital Heart Surgery Nomenclature was developed to provide a generic classification system.

==== Hypoplasia ====
Hypoplasia can affect the heart, typically resulting in the underdevelopment of the right ventricle or the left ventricle. This causes only one side of the heart to be capable of pumping blood to the body and lungs effectively. Hypoplasia of the heart is rare but is the most serious form of CHD. It is called hypoplastic left heart syndrome when it affects the left side of the heart and hypoplastic right heart syndrome when it affects the right side of the heart. In both conditions, the presence of a patent ductus arteriosus (and, when hypoplasia affects the right side of the heart, a patent foramen ovale) is vital to the infant's ability to survive until emergency heart surgery can be performed, since without these pathways blood cannot circulate to the body (or lungs, depending on which side of the heart is defective). Hypoplasia of the heart is generally a cyanotic heart defect.

==== Obstructive defects ====
Obstructive defects occur when heart valves, arteries, or veins are abnormally narrow or blocked. Common defects include pulmonic stenosis, aortic stenosis, and coarctation of the aorta, with other types such as bicuspid aortic valve stenosis and subaortic stenosis being comparatively rare. Any narrowing or blockage can cause heart enlargement or hypertension.

==== Septal defects ====
The septum is a wall of tissue which separates the left heart from the right heart. Defects in the interatrial septum or the interventricular septum allow blood to flow from the left side of the heart to the right, reducing the heart's efficiency. Ventricular septal defects are collectively the most common type of CHD, although approximately 30% of adults have a type of atrial septal defect called probe patent foramen ovale. An atrioventricular septal defect is more complex involving an atrial septal defect, a ventricular septal defect, and irregularities in the heart valves.

==== Cyanotic defects ====
Cyanotic heart defects are called such because they result in cyanosis, a bluish-grey discoloration of the skin due to a lack of oxygen in the body. Such defects include persistent truncus arteriosus, total anomalous pulmonary venous connection, tetralogy of Fallot, transposition of the great vessels, and tricuspid atresia.

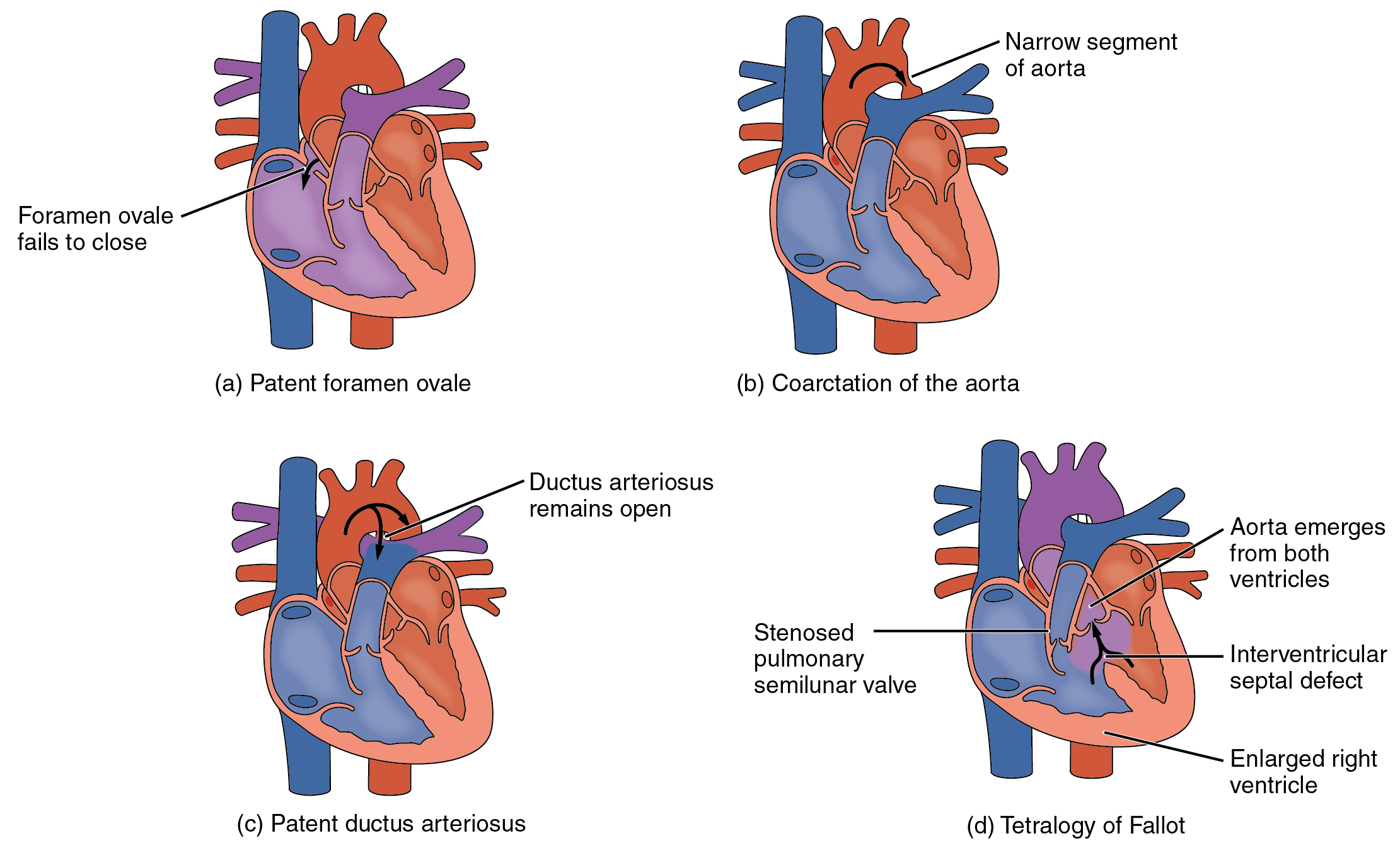
Diagrams of (a) patent foramen ovale, (b) coarctation of the aorta, (c) patent ductus arteriosus, and (d) tetralogy of Fallot with ventricular septal defect.

==== Defects ====
- Aortic stenosis
- Arrhythmogenic right ventricular cardiomyopathy
- Atrial septal defect (ASD)
- Atrioventricular septal defect (AVSD)
- Bicuspid aortic valve
- Cardiomyopathy
- Complete heart block (CHB)
- Dextrocardia
- Double inlet left ventricle (DILV)
- Double outlet right ventricle (DORV)
- Ebstein's anomaly
- Early Repolarization Syndrome
- Holmes heart
- Hypoplastic left heart syndrome (HLHS)
- Hypoplastic right heart syndrome (HRHS)
- Mitral stenosis
- Myocardial bridge
- Persistent truncus arteriosus
- Pulmonary atresia
- Pulmonary stenosis
- Pulmonary vein stenosis
- Rhabdomyomas (Tumors of the Heart)
- Transposition of the great vessels
  - dextro-Transposition of the great arteries (d-TGA)
  - levo-Transposition of the great arteries (l-TGA)
- Tricuspid atresia
- Ventricular septal defect (VSD)
- Wolff–Parkinson–White syndrome (WPW)

Some conditions affect the great vessels or other vessels in close proximity to the heart, but not the heart itself, but are often classified as congenital heart defects.

- Coarctation of the aorta (CoA)
- Double aortic arch, aberrant subclavian artery, and other malformations of the great arteries
- Interrupted aortic arch (IAA)
- Patent ductus arteriosus (PDA)
- Scimitar syndrome (SS)
  - Partial anomalous pulmonary venous connection (PAPVC)
  - Total anomalous pulmonary venous connection (TAPVC)

Some constellations of multiple defects are commonly found together.

- Tetralogy of Fallot (ToF)
- Pentalogy of Cantrell
- Shone's syndrome/ Shone's complex / Shone's anomaly

== Treatment ==
CHD may require surgery and medications. Medications include diuretics, which aid the body in eliminating water, salts, and digoxin for strengthening the contraction of the heart. This slows the heartbeat and removes some fluid from tissues. Some defects require surgical procedures to restore circulation back to normal and in some cases, multiple surgeries are needed.

Interventional cardiology now offers minimally invasive alternatives to surgery for some patients. The Melody Transcatheter Pulmonary Valve (TPV), approved in Europe in 2006 and in the U.S. in 2010 under a Humanitarian Device Exemption (HDE), is designed to treat congenital heart disease patients with a dysfunctional conduit in their right ventricular outflow tract (RVOT). The RVOT is the connection between the heart and lungs; once blood reaches the lungs, it is enriched with oxygen before being pumped to the rest of the body. Transcatheter pulmonary valve technology provides a less-invasive means to extend the life of a failed RVOT conduit and is designed to allow physicians to deliver a replacement pulmonary valve via a catheter through the patient's blood vessels.

Many people require lifelong specialized cardiac care, first with a pediatric cardiologist and later with an adult congenital cardiologist. There are more than 1.8 million adults living with congenital heart defects.

Exercise training Exercise training may improve exercise capacity in adults with congenital heart disease. A systematic review and meta-analysis of nine trials involving 403 adults found improvements in peak oxygen uptake, maximal workload, and exercise duration. However, the quality of evidence ranged from moderate to very low, and the authors noted that further studies with longer follow-up are needed.

=== Mental health ===
Supporting people with chronic diseases such as congenital heart disease with emotional problems and mental health is a treatment consideration. Since some people with congenital heart disease have a lower quality of life that is related to their condition, some people may struggle with finding a job, engaging in physical exercise, with their fertility, and clinical depression as examples. An estimated 31% of adults with congenital heart disease also have mood disorders. Psychotherapy may be helpful for treating some people who have congenital heart disease and depression, however further research is needed to determine the best way to reduce depression including the length of treatments required for an improvement, type of psychotherapy treatments, and how the psychotherapy sessions are delivered.

== Epidemiology ==
Congenital heart anomalies deaths per million persons in 2012 0-8 9-12 13-23 24-31 32-39 40-47 48-50 51-56 57-63 64-124

Heart defects are among the most common birth defect, occurring in 1% of live births (2–3% including bicuspid aortic valve). In 2013, 34.3 million people had CHD. In 2010, they resulted in 223,000 deaths, down from 278,000 deaths in 1990.

For congenital heart defects that arise without a family history (de novo), the recurrence risk in offspring is 3–5%. This risk is higher in left ventricular outflow tract obstructions, heterotaxy, and atrioventricular septal defects.

== Terminology ==
Congenital heart defects are known by a number of names including congenital heart anomaly, congenital heart disease, heart defects, and congenital cardiovascular malformations.

== See also ==
- Congenital Heart Surgeons' Society
- Congenital heart block
- Tiny Tickers, UK charity focussing on Congenital heart defects
