= Pulmonary vein stenosis =

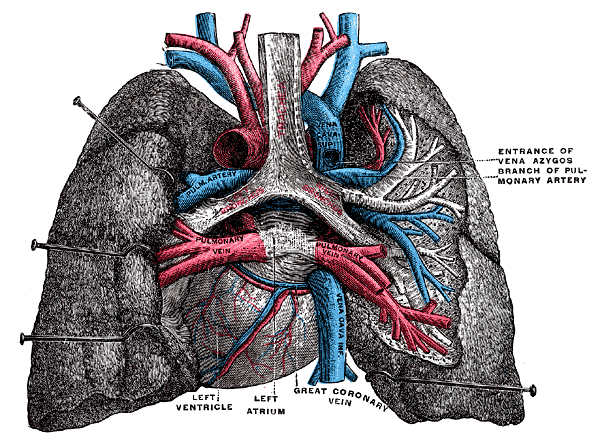
- Pulmonary veins
- Specialty: Cardiovascular

Pulmonary vein stenosis is a rare cardiovascular disorder. It is recognized as being the stenosis of one or more of the four pulmonary veins that return blood from the lungs to the left atrium of the heart. In congenital cases, it is associated with poor prognosis and high mortality rate. In some people, pulmonary vein stenosis occurs after pulmonary vein ablation for the treatment of atrial fibrillation. Some recent research has indicated that it may be genetically linked in congenital cases.

== Signs and symptoms ==
Pulmonary vein stenosis usually manifests during the initial years of life. Pneumonia recurrentis and tachypnea are common presentation symptoms rather than the typical early pulmonary hypertension symptoms. Patients may experience a new murmur, right ventricular heart failure, pulmonary edema, failure to thrive, or hemoptysis as the disease worsens and pulmonary hypertension becomes more noticeable.

== Causes ==
Pulmonary vein stenosis can be congenital or acquired.

A rare abnormality that accounts for 0.4% of congenital heart diseases, congenital pulmonary vein stenosis results from the common right or left pulmonary vein failing to integrate into the left atrium (LA) during the vessel's embryonic development, obliterating the pulmonary veins partially or completely on one or both sides.

The main cause of pulmonary vein stenosis is radiofrequency ablation for atrial fibrillation.

Pneumonia resulting from sarcoidosis may be caused by granulomatous involvement or extrinsic compression due to lymphadenopathies. Uncontrolled fibrosis surrounding the afflicted mediastinal lymph nodes is the hallmark of fibrosing mediastinitis, a rare consequence of tuberculosis and Histoplasma capsulatum infection that can cause invasion as well as obstruction of the surrounding pulmonary veins. Neoplasms next to the pulmonary veins have the potential to compress or infiltrate, resulting in stenosis.

In the pediatric population, the most common cause of clinically significant pulmonary vein stenosis is complete anomalous pulmonary venous return repair. Localized obliteration can occur further into the center of the vessel or at the point where the pulmonary vein anastomoses into the left atrium. The literature contains isolated reports of lung transplantation, suture repair of a pulmonary vein cannulation site, and pulmonary vein injury resulting in obstruction following myxoma resection.

== Diagnosis ==
Pulmonary vein stenosis may be identified by noninvasive procedures such as magnetic resonance imaging, multidetector CT angiography, radionuclide quantitative pulmonary flow imaging, and echocardiography with Doppler ultrasonography.

== Treatment ==
Although clinical and imaging surveillance is recommended because the disease can change over time, mild and asymptomatic pulmonary vein stenosis may not require intervention. When it comes to the majority of pulmonary vein stenosis cases, whether congenital or acquired, surgery is the recommended course of action.

Systemic Sirolimus therapy has shown promising results for the treatment of pulmonary vein stenosis. with one trial managing to achieve a 100% survival rate in a small cohort of patients with severe disease.
