= Gene knockout =

Genetic technique

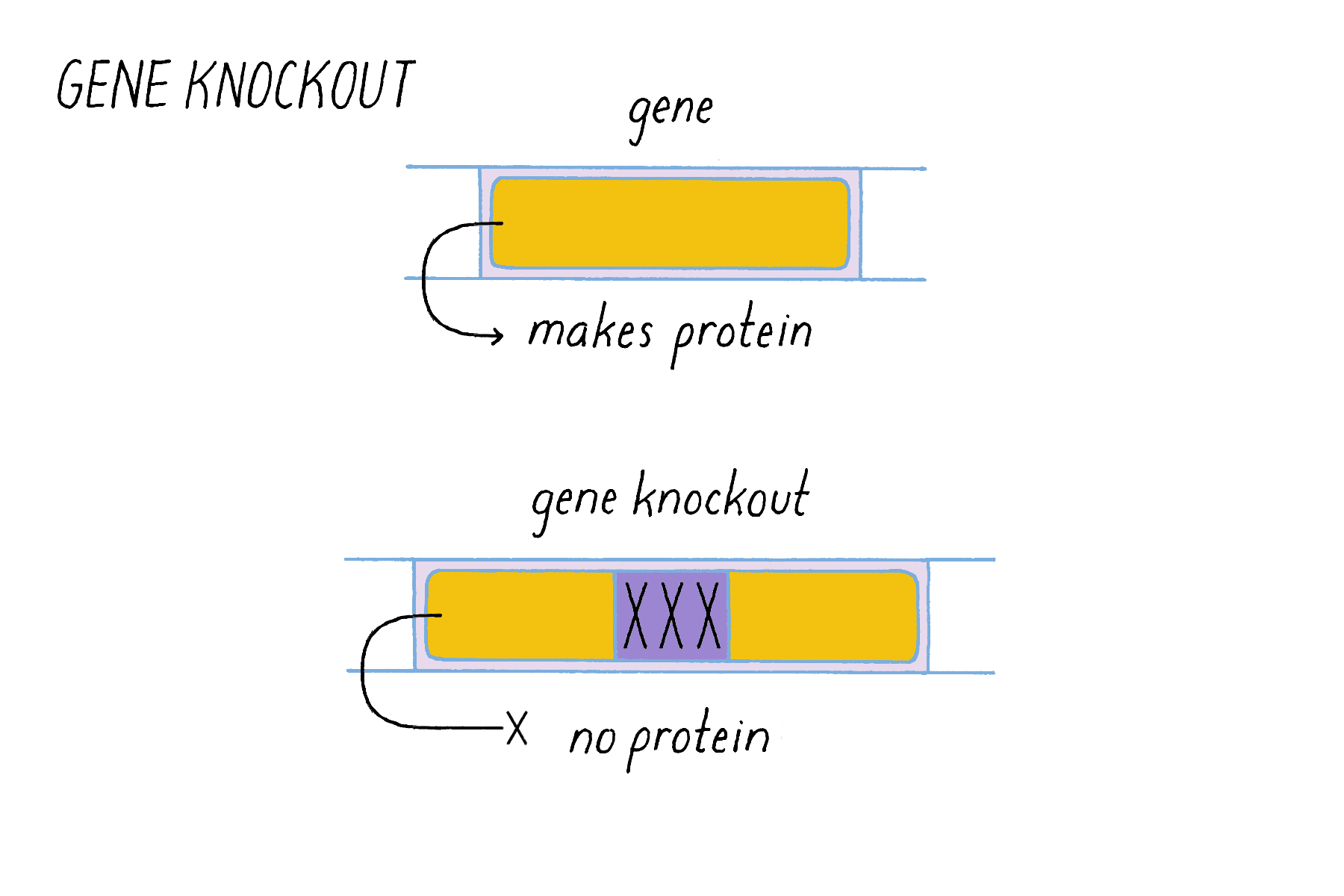
An experimental technique that alters the genetic code of an organism and renders a specific gene (or genes) non-functional. A gene knockout can be produced by disrupting the continuity of a gene with an inserted piece of DNA.

Gene knockouts (also known as gene deletion or gene inactivation) are a widely used genetic engineering technique that involves the targeted removal or inactivation of a specific gene within an organism's genome. This can be done through a variety of methods, including homologous recombination, CRISPR-Cas9, and TALENs.

One of the main advantages of gene knockouts is that they allow researchers to study the function of a specific gene in vivo, and to understand the role of the gene in normal development and physiology as well as in the pathology of diseases. By studying the phenotype of the organism with the knocked out gene, researchers can gain insights into the biological processes that the gene is involved in.

There are two main types of gene knockouts: complete and conditional. A complete gene knockout permanently inactivates the gene, while a conditional gene knockout allows for the gene to be turned off and on at specific times or in specific tissues. Conditional knockouts are particularly useful for studying developmental processes and for understanding the role of a gene in specific cell types or tissues.

Gene knockouts have been widely used in many different organisms, including bacteria, yeast, zebrafish, Drosophila melanogaster and mice. In mice, gene knockouts are commonly used to study the function of specific genes in development, physiology, and cancer research.

The use of gene knockouts in mouse models has been particularly valuable in the study of human diseases. For example, gene knockouts in mice have been used to study the role of specific genes in cancer, neurological disorders, immune disorders, and metabolic disorders.

However, gene knockouts also have some limitations. For example, the loss of a single gene may not fully mimic the effects of a genetic disorder, and the knockouts may have unintended effects on other genes or pathways. Additionally, gene knockouts are not always a good model for human disease as the mouse genome is not identical to the human genome, and mouse physiology is different from human physiology.

The KO technique is essentially the opposite of a gene knock-in. Knocking out two genes simultaneously in an organism is known as a double knockout (DKO). Similarly the terms triple knockout (TKO) and quadruple knockouts (QKO) are used to describe three or four knocked out genes, respectively. However, one needs to distinguish between heterozygous and homozygous KOs. In the former, only one of two gene copies (alleles) is knocked out, in the latter both are knocked out.

== Methods ==
Knockouts are accomplished through a variety of techniques. Originally, naturally occurring mutations were identified and then gene loss or inactivation had to be established by DNA sequencing or other methods.

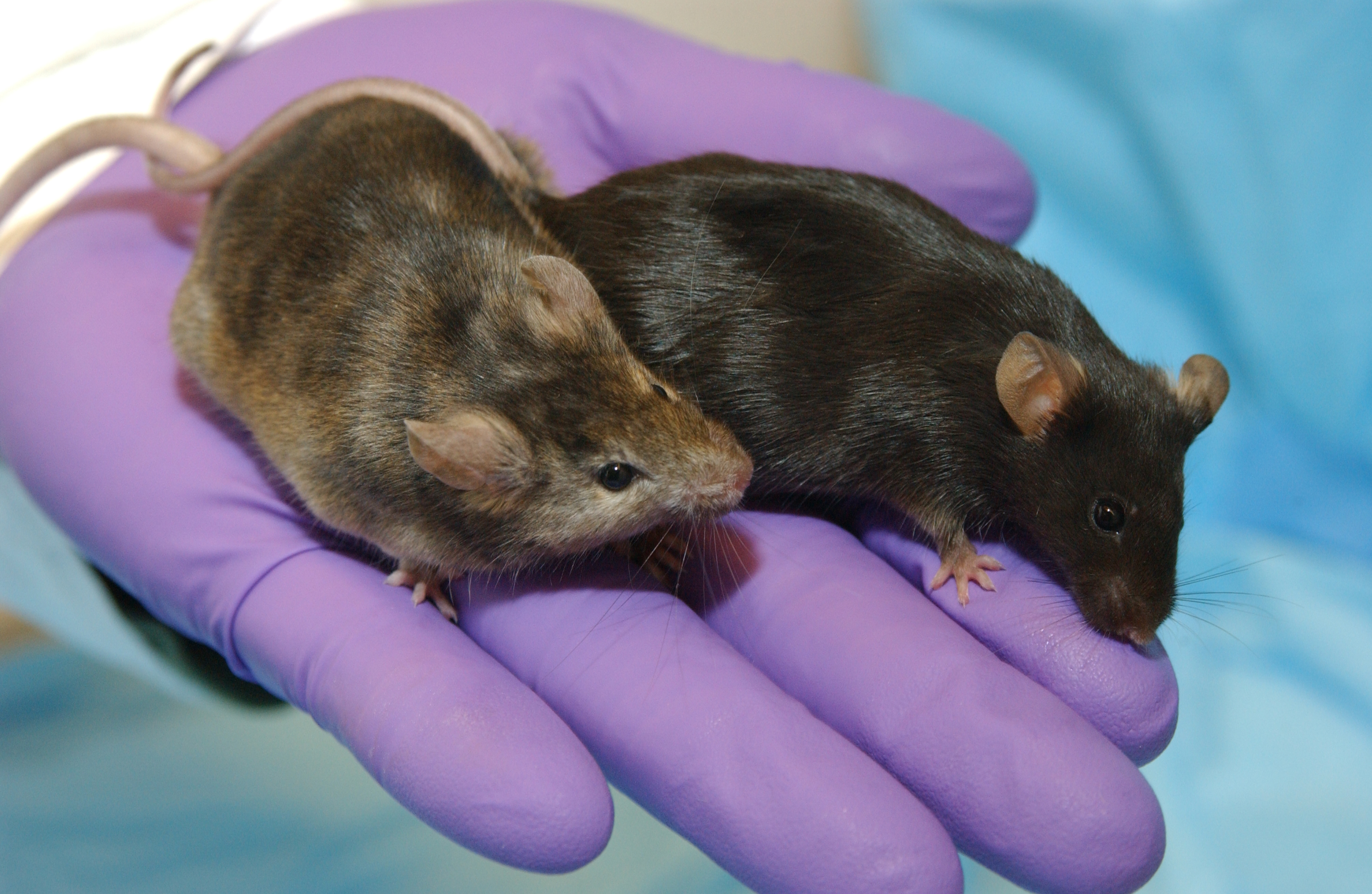
A laboratory mouse in which a gene affecting hair growth has been knocked out (left), is shown next to a normal lab mouse.

== Gene knockout by mutation ==
Gene knockout by mutation is commonly carried out in bacteria. An early instance of the use of this technique in Escherichia coli was published in 1989 by Hamilton, et al. In this experiment, two sequential recombinations were used to delete the gene. This work established the feasibility of removing or replacing a functional gene in bacteria. That method has since been developed for other organisms, particularly research animals, like mice. Knockout mice are commonly used to study genes with human equivalents that may have significance for disease. An example of a study using knockout mice is an investigation of the roles of Xirp proteins in Sudden Unexplained Nocturnal Death Syndrome (SUNDS) and Brugada Syndrome in the Chinese Han Population.

== Gene silencing ==
For gene knockout investigations, RNA interference (RNAi), a more recent method, also known as gene silencing, has gained popularity. In RNA interference (RNAi), messenger RNA for a particular gene is inactivated using small interfering RNA (siRNA) or short hairpin RNA (shRNA). This effectively stops the gene from being expressed. Oncogenes like bcl-2 and p53, as well as genes linked to neurological disease, genetic disorders, and viral infections, have all been targeted for gene silencing utilizing RNA interference (RNAi).

=== Homologous recombination ===
Homologous recombination is the exchange of genes between two DNA strands that include extensive regions of base sequences that are identical to one another. In eukaryotic species, bacteria, and some viruses, homologous recombination happens spontaneously and is a useful tool in genetic engineering. Homologous recombination, which takes place during meiosis in eukaryotes, is essential for the repair of double-stranded DNA breaks and promotes genetic variation by allowing the movement of genetic information during chromosomal crossing. Homologous recombination, a key DNA repair mechanism in bacteria, enables the insertion of genetic material acquired through horizontal transfer of genes and transformation into DNA. Homologous recombination in viruses influences the course of viral evolution. Homologous recombination, a type of gene targeting used in genetic engineering, involves the introduction of an engineered mutation into a particular gene in order to learn more about the function of that gene. This method involves inserting foreign DNA into a cell that has a sequence similar to the target gene while being flanked by sequences that are the same upstream and downstream of the target gene. The target gene's DNA is substituted with the foreign DNA sequence during replication when the cell detects the similar flanking regions as homologues. The target gene is "knocked out" by the exchange. By using this technique to target particular alleles in embryonic stem cells in mice, it is possible to create knockout mice. With the aid of gene targeting, numerous mouse genes have been shut down, leading to the creation of hundreds of distinct mouse models of various human diseases, such as cancer, diabetes, cardiovascular diseases, and neurological disorders. Mario Capecchi, Sir Martin J. Evans, and Oliver Smithies performed groundbreaking research on homologous recombination in mouse stem cells, and they shared the 2007 Nobel Prize in Physiology or Medicine for their findings. Traditionally, homologous recombination was the main method for causing a gene knockout. This method involves creating a DNA construct containing the desired mutation. For knockout purposes, this typically involves a drug resistance marker in place of the desired knockout gene. The construct will also contain a minimum of 2kb of homology to the target sequence. The construct can be delivered to stem cells either through microinjection or electroporation. This method then relies on the cell's own repair mechanisms to recombine the DNA construct into the existing DNA. This results in the sequence of the gene being altered, and most cases the gene will be translated into a nonfunctional protein, if it is translated at all. However, this is an inefficient process, as homologous recombination accounts for only 10^{−2} to 10^{−3} of DNA integrations. Often, the drug selection marker on the construct is used to select for cells in which the recombination event has occurred.

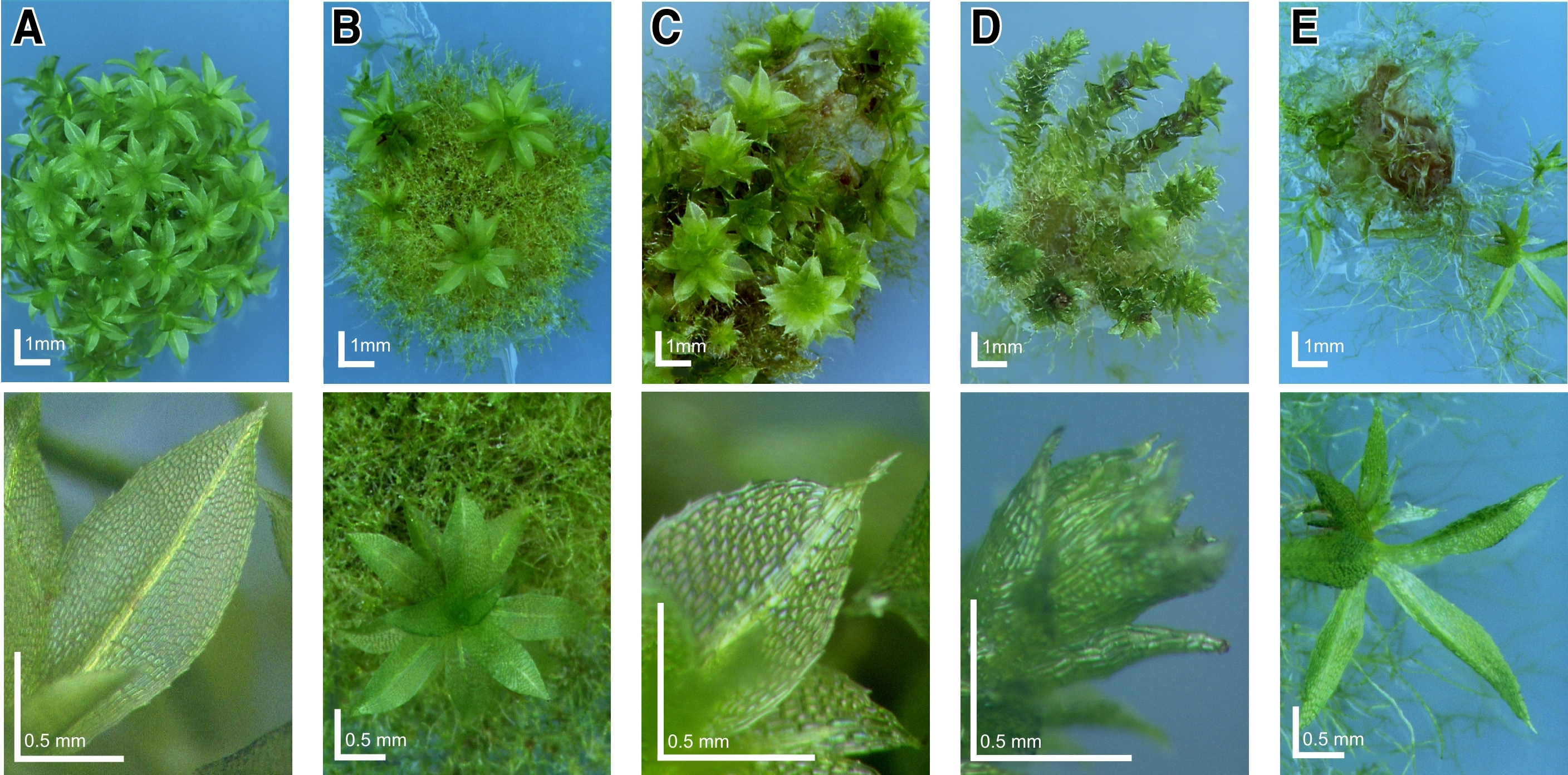
Wild-type Physcomitrella and knockout mosses: Deviating phenotypes induced in gene-disruption library transformants. Physcomitrella wild-type and transformed plants were grown on minimal Knop medium to induce differentiation and development of gametophores. For each plant, an overview (upper row; scale bar corresponds to 1 mm) and a close-up (bottom row; scale bar equals 0.5 mm) are shown. A: Haploid wild-type moss plant completely covered with leafy gametophores and close-up of wild-type leaf. B–E: Different mutants.

These stem cells now lacking the gene could be used in vivo, for instance in mice, by inserting them into early embryos. If the resulting chimeric mouse contained the genetic change in their germline, this could then be passed on offspring.

In diploid organisms, which contain two alleles for most genes, and may as well contain several related genes that collaborate in the same role, additional rounds of transformation and selection are performed until every targeted gene is knocked out. Selective breeding may be required to produce homozygous knockout animals.

=== Site-specific nucleases ===
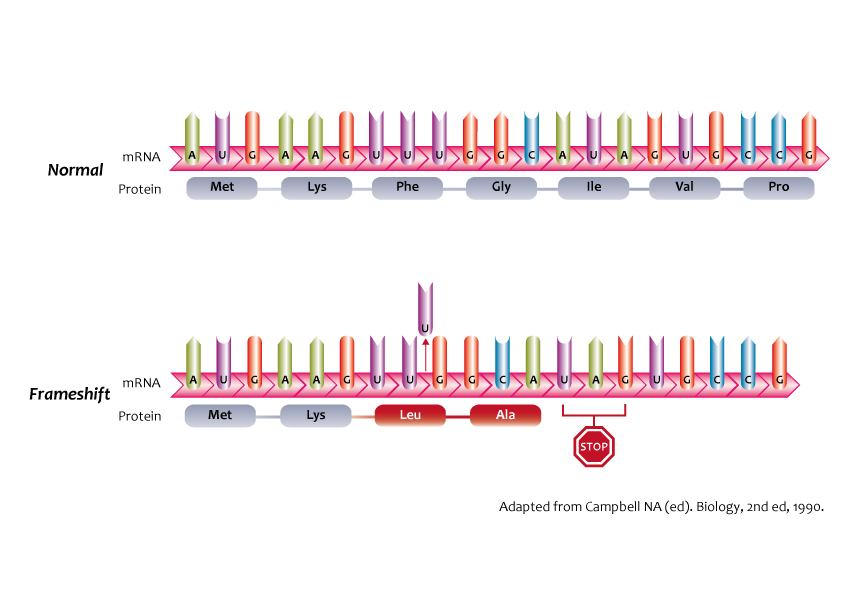
Frameshift mutation resulting from a single base pair deletion, causing altered amino acid sequence and premature stop codon

There are currently three methods in use that involve precisely targeting a DNA sequence in order to introduce a double-stranded break. Once this occurs, the cell's repair mechanisms will attempt to repair this double stranded break, often through non-homologous end joining (NHEJ), which involves directly ligating the two cut ends together. This may be done imperfectly, therefore sometimes causing insertions or deletions of base pairs, which cause frameshift mutations. These mutations can render the gene in which they occur nonfunctional, thus creating a knockout of that gene. This process is more efficient than homologous recombination, and therefore can be more easily used to create biallelic knockouts.

==== Zinc-fingers ====
Zinc-finger nucleases consist of DNA binding domains that can precisely target a DNA sequence. Each zinc-finger can recognize codons of a desired DNA sequence, and therefore can be modularly assembled to bind to a particular sequence. These binding domains are coupled with a restriction endonuclease that can cause a double stranded break (DSB) in the DNA. Repair processes may introduce mutations that destroy functionality of the gene.

==== TALENS ====
Transcription activator-like effector nucleases (TALENs) also contain a DNA binding domain and a nuclease that can cleave DNA. The DNA binding region consists of amino acid repeats that each recognize a single base pair of the desired targeted DNA sequence. If this cleavage is targeted to a gene coding region, and NHEJ-mediated repair introduces insertions and deletions, a frameshift mutation often results, thus disrupting function of the gene.

==== CRISPR/Cas9 ====
CRISPR (Clustered Regularly Interspaced Short Palindromic Repeats) is a genetic engineering technique that allows for precise editing of the genome. One application of CRISPR is gene knockout, which involves disabling or "knocking out" a specific gene in an organism.

The process of gene knockout with CRISPR involves three main steps: designing a guide RNA (gRNA) that targets a specific location in the genome, delivering the gRNA and a Cas9 enzyme (which acts as a molecular scissors) to the target cell, and then allowing the cell to repair the cut in the DNA. When the cell repairs the cut, it can either join the cut ends back together, resulting in a non-functional gene, or introduce a mutation that disrupts the gene's function.

This technique can be used in a variety of organisms, including bacteria, yeast, plants, and animals, and it allows scientists to study the function of specific genes by observing the effects of their absence. CRISPR-based gene knockout is a powerful tool for understanding the genetic basis of disease and for developing new therapies.

CRISPR-based gene knockout, like any genetic engineering technique, has the potential to produce unintended or harmful effects on the organism, so it should be used with caution. The coupled Cas9 will cause a double stranded break in the DNA. Following the same principle as zinc-fingers and TALENs, the attempts to repair these double stranded breaks often result in frameshift mutations that result in an nonfunctional gene. Non invasive CRISPR-Cas9 technology has successfully knocked out a gene associated in depression and anxiety in mice, being the first successful delivery passing through the blood–brain barrier to enable gene modification.

=== Knock-in ===
Gene knock-in is similar to gene knockout, but it replaces a gene with another instead of deleting it.

== Types ==
=== Conditional knockouts ===
A conditional gene knockout allows gene deletion in a tissue in a tissue specific manner. This is required in place of a gene knockout if the null mutation would lead to embryonic death, or a specific tissue or cell type is of specific interest. This is done by introducing short sequences called loxP sites around the gene. These sequences will be introduced into the germ-line via the same mechanism as a knockout. This germ-line can then be crossed to another germline containing Cre-recombinase which is a viral enzyme that can recognize these sequences, recombines them and deletes the gene flanked by these sites. Other recombinases have since been created and employed in conditional knockout experiments.

== Use ==
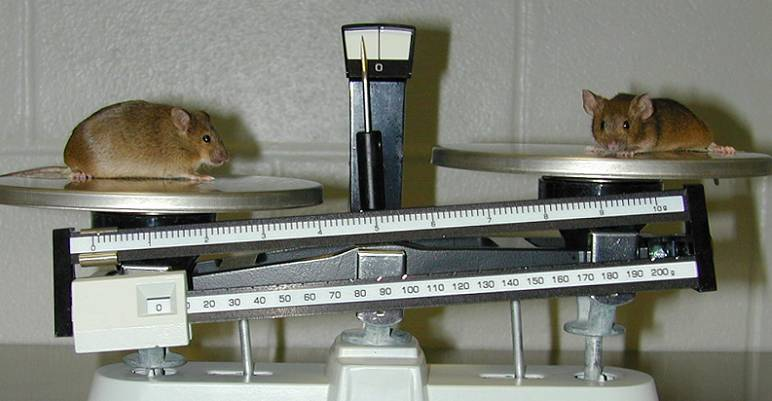
A knockout mouse (left) that is a model of obesity, compared with a normal mouse

Knockouts are primarily used to understand the role of a specific gene or DNA region by comparing the knockout organism to a wildtype with a similar genetic background.

Knockout organisms are also used as screening tools in the development of drugs, to target specific biological processes or deficiencies by using a specific knockout, or to understand the mechanism of action of a drug by using a library of knockout organisms spanning the entire genome, such as in Saccharomyces cerevisiae.

== See also ==
- Essential gene
- Gene knockdown
- Conditional gene knockout
- Germline
- Gene silencing
- Genome editing
- Planned extinction
- Recombineering
- Myostatin
- Belgian Blue
