= Cholestasis facies =

- Differential diagnosis: Alagille syndrome

Cholestasis facies are a type of facies considered a symptom of Alagille syndrome. However it appears not to be specific but "a general feature of congenital intrahepatic cholestatic liver disease".
