= Holmes heart =

- Specialty: Cardiology

Holmes heart is a rare congenital heart disease with absence of the inflow tract of the morphologically right ventricle (RV) and hence a single left ventricle (LV). The great vessels are normally related, with the pulmonary artery arising from the small infundibular outlet chamber, and the aorta arising from the single left ventricle.

The Holmes heart is named after Dr. Andrew F. Holmes, who first described an autopsy specimen of this congenital heart defect in 1824. Dr. Holmes later became the first Dean of the Medical Faculty at McGill University in Canada.
