= Daniel Alagille =

French pediatrician (1925–2005)

- Born: 24 January 1925; Paris
- Died: 8 November 2005 (aged 80)
- Known for: Alagille syndrome
- Scientific career
- Fields: Pediatrics, hepatology
- Institutions: Bicêtre Hospital

Daniel Alagille (24 January 1925 – 8 November 2005) was a French physician who specialized in pediatric hepatology, the study of childhood liver diseases.

== Biography ==
Alagille was born in Paris in 1925. He was educated at the University of Paris and then worked at the University of Paris-Sud, becoming a full professor in 1971.

Alagille directed a pediatric hepatology unit at Bicêtre Hospital in Paris for many years before retiring in 1990. Alagille syndrome is named for him, as he had first described the condition in 1969. He recognized that a number of his patients with bile duct problems also suffered from problems in other body parts, including the heart and face. Alagille established the initial criteria for diagnosing the syndrome.

Alagille served as editor-in-chief of the Revue internationale d'hépatologie and the Archives francaises de pédiatrie. He was received into the French National Order of Merit in 1967 and the Legion of Honour in 1988. With his former trainee and colleague Michel Odièvre, he wrote the first textbook of pediatric hepatology, Maladies du Foie et des Voies Biliaires chez l'Enfant (Liver and Bile Duct Diseases in Children). In 1994, he became the third recipient of the Andrew Sass Kortsak Award from the Canadian Liver Foundation.

Alagille died in 2005 following heart surgery.
