= JAG1 =

Protein found in humans

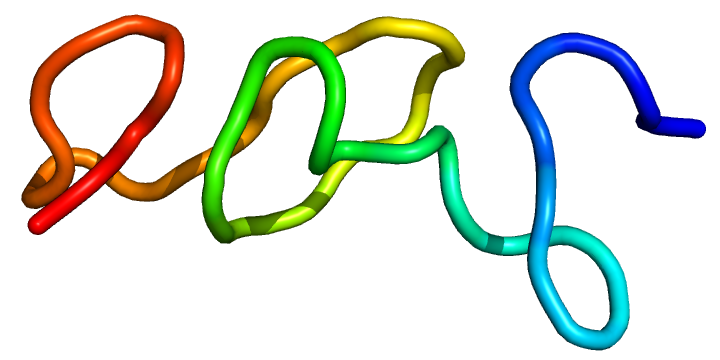

Identifiers
- Aliases: JAG1, Jag1, ABE2, Gsfabe2, Htu, Ozz, Ser-1, AGS, AHD, AWS, CD339, HJ1, JAGL1, jagged 1, AGS1, DCHE, jagged canonical Notch ligand 1, CMT2HH
- External IDs: OMIM: 601920; MGI: 1095416; GeneCards: JAG1
Available structures
PDB	Ortholog search: PDBe RCSB
PDB	List of PDB id codes 2KB9, 2VJ2, 4CBZ, 4CC0, 4CC1, 4XI7, 5BO1

Gene location (Human)
Chr.	Chromosome 20 (human)
Band	20p12.2	Start	10,637,684 bp
Band	20p12.2	End	10,673,999 bp

Gene location (Mouse)
Chr.	Chromosome 2 (mouse)
Band	2 F3|2	Start	136,923,376 bp
Band	2 F3|2	End	136,958,564 bp
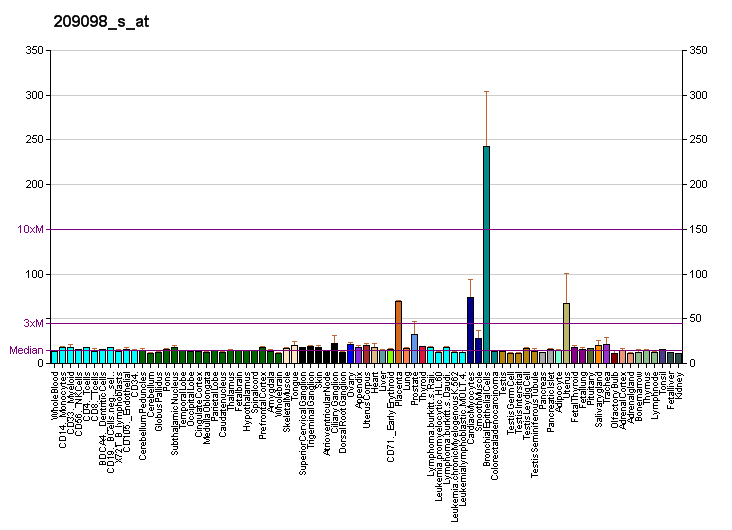

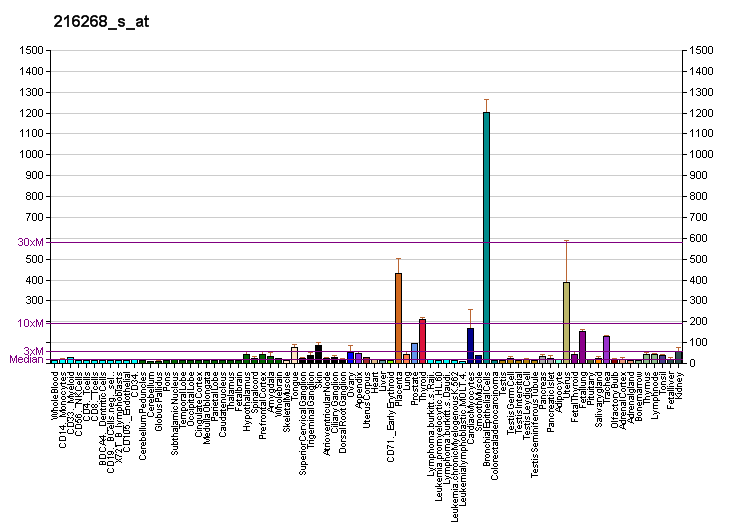

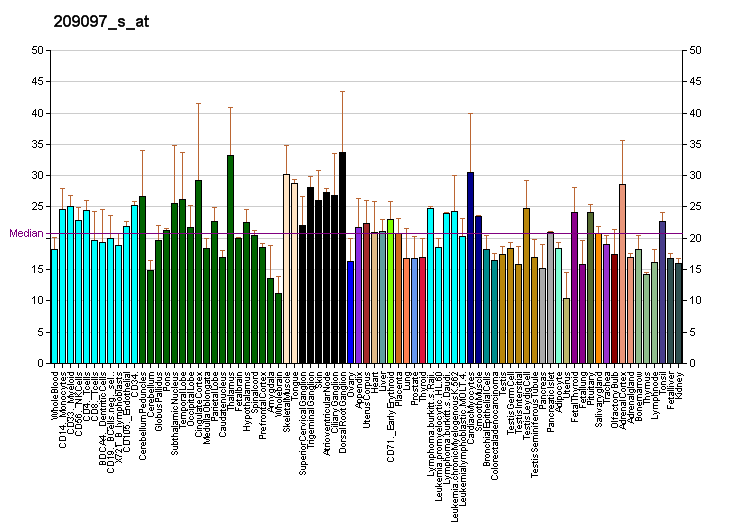
RNA expression pattern
Bgee	Human / Mouse (ortholog); Top expressed in: skin of thigh; skin of hip; gingival epithelium; right coronary artery; human penis; palpebral conjunctiva; urethra; oral cavity; vulva; hair follicle / Top expressed in: secondary oocyte; primary oocyte; external carotid artery; internal carotid artery; epidermis; epithelium of lens; hair follicle; molar; umbilical cord; neural layer of retina; More reference expression data
BioGPS	More reference expression data
Gene ontology
Molecular function	calcium ion binding; structural molecule activity; Notch binding; protein binding; growth factor activity; phospholipid binding
Cellular component	integral component of membrane; adherens junction; plasma membrane; apical part of cell; integral component of plasma membrane; extracellular region; apical plasma membrane; membrane
Biological process	Notch signaling pathway; T cell mediated immunity; negative regulation of fat cell differentiation; pulmonary valve morphogenesis; glomerular visceral epithelial cell development; endocardial cushion cell development; loop of Henle development; negative regulation of neuron differentiation; distal tubule development; pulmonary artery morphogenesis; cardiac septum morphogenesis; negative regulation of cell differentiation; response to muramyl dipeptide; ciliary body morphogenesis; aorta morphogenesis; nervous system development; keratinocyte differentiation; cardiac neural crest cell development involved in outflow tract morphogenesis; neuronal stem cell population maintenance; negative regulation of stem cell differentiation; multicellular organism development; cell communication; blood vessel remodeling; inner ear auditory receptor cell differentiation; positive regulation of osteoblast differentiation; regulation of cell population proliferation; angiogenesis; nephron development; animal organ morphogenesis; cell fate determination; inner ear development; endothelial cell differentiation; camera-type eye development; myoblast differentiation; cardiac right ventricle morphogenesis; morphogenesis of an epithelial sheet; positive regulation of myeloid cell differentiation; positive regulation of Notch signaling pathway; positive regulation of transcription by RNA polymerase II; Notch signaling involved in heart development; negative regulation of endothelial cell differentiation; regulation of signaling receptor activity; negative regulation of cell-matrix adhesion; negative regulation of cell-cell adhesion; negative regulation of cell migration; hemopoiesis; aortic valve morphogenesis; cardiac epithelial to mesenchymal transition; positive regulation of cardiac epithelial to mesenchymal transition; negative regulation of Notch signaling pathway
Sources:Amigo / QuickGO
Orthologs
Databases	NCBI: entry; OMA: entry
Species	Human	Mouse
Entrez	182	16449
Ensembl	ENSG00000101384	ENSMUSG00000027276
UniProt	P78504	Q9QXX0
RefSeq (mRNA)	NM_000214	NM_013822
RefSeq (protein)	NP_000205	NP_038850
Location (UCSC)	Chr 20: 10.64 – 10.67 Mb	Chr 2: 136.92 – 136.96 Mb
PubMed search
- Wikidata
View/Edit Human	View/Edit Mouse

Jagged1 (JAG1) is one of five cell surface proteins (ligands) that interact with four receptors in the mammalian Notch signaling pathway. The Notch signaling pathway is a highly conserved pathway that functions to establish and regulate cell fate decisions in many organ systems. Once the JAG1-NOTCH (receptor-ligand) interactions take place, a cascade of proteolytic cleavages is triggered resulting in activation of the transcription for downstream target genes. Located on human chromosome 20, the JAG1 gene is expressed in multiple organ systems in the body and causes the autosomal dominant disorder Alagille syndrome (ALGS) resulting from loss of function mutations within the gene. JAG1 has also been designated as CD339 (cluster of differentiation 339).

== Structure and function ==
JAG1 was first identified as a ligand that was able to activate notch receptors when the rat gene Jagged encoding a protein homolog was cloned in 1995. The structure of the JAG1 protein includes a small intracellular component, a transmembrane motif, proceeded by an extracellular region containing a cystine-rich region, 16 EGF-like repeats, a DSL domain, and finally a signal peptide totaling 1218 amino acids in length over 26 coding exons.

The JAG1 protein encoded by JAG1 is the human homolog of the Drosophila jagged protein. Human JAG1 is one of five ligands for receptors in the NOTCH signaling pathway which helps to determine cellular fate and is active during many developmental stages. The extracellular component of the JAG1 protein physically interacts with its respective Notch receptor. This interaction kicks off a cascade of proteolytic cleavages leading to the original NOTCH intracellular domain being trafficked into the nucleus of the cell leading to the activation of different target genes.

== Expression profile and mouse studies ==
In situ hybridization and conditional gene knockout studies have helped to demonstrate the role JAG1 plays in development and its effects on different organ systems. In humans, JAG1 has broad expression in many tissue types including the pancreas, heart, placenta, prostate, lung, kidney, thymus, testis, and leucocytes in the adult. In a developing embryo JAG1 expression is concentrated around the pulmonary artery, mesocardium, distal cardic outflow tract, major arteries, metanephros, branchial arches, pancreas, the portal vein, and otocyst. Generally, JAG1 expression patterns correlate with organ systems affected in ALGS, although not all tissues where JAG1 is expressed are affected in ALGS. More recently JAG1 expression has been found to be altered in breast cancer and adrenocortical carcinoma patients.

Mouse models where the Jag1 gene is turned off in certain tissues (conditional knockout mouse models) have been used to study the role of Jag1 in many tissue specific areas. While homozygous deletions of Jag1 have been shown to be embryonic lethal in mice, and heterozygous deletions may show only a limited phenotype (involving the eye), mice haploinsufficient for both Jag1 and Notch2 present with the ALGS phenotype. Conditional gene knockout mouse models with Jag1 mutations targeted to the portal vein mesenchyme, endothelium, and cranial neural crest all exhibit features classic to those in individuals with ALGS, highlighting the role of this tissue type in disease origins

== Disease phenotype ==
ALGS is an autosomal dominant multi-system disorder affecting several body systems including the liver, heart, skeleton, eye, facial structure, kidneys and vascular system. The most clinically significant concerns stem from liver, heart, vascular or renal problems. Mutations in JAG1 were first discovered to be responsible for ALGS by researchers at The Children's Hospital of Philadelphia and the National Institutes of Health in 1997. Patients who are clinically consistent with the disorder usually have a mutation in JAG1 (94%), while a smaller 2% have a mutation in NOTCH2. Over half of individuals with mutations in the gene did not inherit it from either parent, and thus have a de novo mutation. JAG1 mutation types include protein truncating (splice site, frameshift, and nonsense), missense, and whole gene deletions accounting for 80%, 7%, and 12% respectively. Since all mutation types lead to a patient phenotype, it is thought that haploinsufficiency for JAG1 is the likely disease mechanism of action. Although individuals can have a range of mutation types in JAG1, all of the known mutations lead to loss of the function of one copy, and, there is no correlation between mutation type or location and disease severity. Though individuals with ALGS have several body systems affected, there is a subset of individuals with JAG1 mutations who present with tetralogy of fallot/pulmonary stenosis that do not show the other clinical signs of the syndrome. Given the variable expressivity of the disease, there may be other genetic or environmental modifiers present beyond the original JAG1 mutation.

More recently, JAG1 expression changes have been implicated in many types of cancer. Specifically, up regulation of JAG1 has been correlated with both poor overall breast cancer survival rates and an enhancement of tumor proliferation in adrenocortical carcinoma patients.

== See also ==
- Notch signaling
- Alagille syndrome
- Autosomal dominant
- Haploinsufficiency
- Tetralogy of fallot
- In situ hybridization
- Conditional gene knockout
- Cluster of differentiation
