= 8p23.1 duplication syndrome =

- Other names: Dup(8)(p23.1p23.1), Trisomy 8p23.1
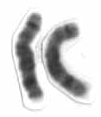
- Chromosome 8 is associated with this condition

8p23.1 duplication syndrome is a rare genetic disorder caused by a duplication of a region from human chromosome 8. This duplication syndrome has an estimated prevalence of 1 in 64,000 births and is the reciprocal of the 8p23.1 deletion syndrome. The 8p23.1 duplication is associated with a variable phenotype including one or more of speech delay, developmental delay, mild dysmorphism, with prominent forehead and arched eyebrows, and congenital heart disease (CHD).

== Presentation ==
The phenotypic data on 11 patients indicated that cases are not always ascertained for CHD but that CHD was the most common single feature found in 6 out of 11 individuals. Developmental delay and/or learning difficulties were found in 5 out of 11 cases, but one prenatal case was developing normally at 15 months of age (Case 1,). Three other prenatal cases could not yet be reliably assessed. A variable degree of facial dysmorphism was present in 5 out of 11 individuals. Partial toe syndactyly has been found in one mother and son diad and adrenal anomalies in two probands but not in the duplicated mother of one of them. The phenotype is compatible with independent adult life with varying degrees of support. Duplication of the GATA4 transcription factor (OMIM: 600576) is believed to underlie the congenital heart disease and other genes, common to the duplication and deletion syndromes, can be regarded as candidates for the 8p23.1 duplication syndrome. These include the SOX7 transcription factor (OMIM: 612202) for both CHD and developmental delay and the TNKS gene (OMIM: 603303) for behavioural difficulties. The diaphragmatic hernia found in the 8p23.1 deletion syndrome has not been found in the 8p23.1 duplication syndrome to date. The duplication may be associated with copy number changes of the adjacent olfactory receptor/defensin repeats (ORDRs) that predispose to the 8p23.1 deletion and duplication syndromes. High total copy numbers of these repeats have been associated with predisposition to psoriasis and low copy number with predisposition to Crohn's disease.

== Genetics ==
The duplication includes ~3.75 Mb between the distal and proximal ORDRs at either end of band 8p23.1. The copy number of the adjacent repeats may also be altered. The 8p23.1 duplication syndrome cannot be distinguished using conventional cytogenetics from high level copy number variation of the repeats themselves.

Both de novo cases and families with transmitted duplications from parents of both sex are known. The duplication is believed to arise de novo as a result of non-allelic homologous recombination (NAHR) between the proximal and distal ORDRs. NAHR is also thought to give rise to the reciprocal microdeletion syndrome, the polymorphic inversion between the ORDRs and a variety of other large scale abnormalities involving the short arm of chromosome 8.

== Diagnosis ==
=== Phenotypes ===
Primary	Secondary	Tertiary
NEUROLOGY	MENTAL, COGNITIVE FUNCTION, general abnormalities	intellectual disability/developmental delay
VOICE	Voice, general abnormalities	Speech delay

== See also ==
- Chromosome 8 (human)
