= JAG2 =

Protein-coding gene in the species Homo sapiens

Identifiers
- Aliases: JAG2, HJ2, SER2, jagged 2, jagged canonical Notch ligand 2, LGMDR27
- External IDs: OMIM: 602570; MGI: 1098270; HomoloGene: 1677; GeneCards: JAG2; OMA:JAG2 - orthologs

Gene location (Human)
Chr.	Chromosome 14 (human)
Band	14q32.33	Start	105,140,982 bp
Band	14q32.33	End	105,168,824 bp

Gene location (Mouse)
Chr.	Chromosome 12 (mouse)
Band	12 F1|12 61.37 cM	Start	112,871,439 bp
Band	12 F1|12 61.37 cM	End	112,893,396 bp
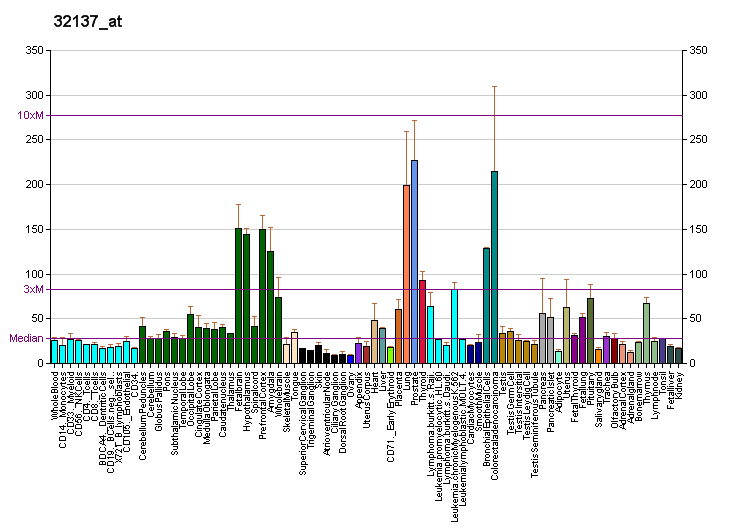

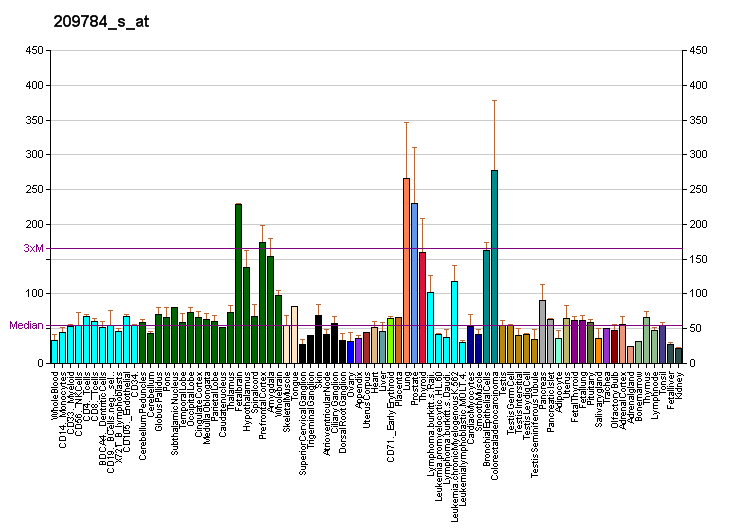
RNA expression pattern
Bgee	Human / Mouse (ortholog); Top expressed in: nipple; apex of heart; pituitary gland; skin of abdomen; anterior pituitary; skin of leg; skin of thigh; endothelial cell; olfactory zone of nasal mucosa; right frontal lobe / Top expressed in: lip; primary oocyte; molar; secondary oocyte; esophagus; superior frontal gyrus; corneal stroma; hair follicle; muscle of thigh; external carotid artery; More reference expression data
BioGPS	More reference expression data
Gene ontology
Molecular function	calcium ion binding; Notch binding; protein binding; growth factor activity
Cellular component	integral component of membrane; membrane; plasma membrane; integral component of plasma membrane
Biological process	Notch signaling pathway; skeletal system development; respiratory system process; epithelial cell apoptotic process involved in palatal shelf morphogenesis; in utero embryonic development; multicellular organism development; odontogenesis of dentin-containing tooth; cell communication; auditory receptor cell fate commitment; T cell differentiation; regulation of cell adhesion; spermatogenesis; morphogenesis of embryonic epithelium; gamma-delta T cell differentiation; thymic T cell selection; positive regulation of Notch signaling pathway; cell differentiation; regulation of cell population proliferation; regulation of signaling receptor activity; negative regulation of Notch signaling pathway
Sources:Amigo / QuickGO
Orthologs
Species	Human	Mouse
Entrez	3714	16450
Ensembl	ENSG00000184916	ENSMUSG00000002799
UniProt	Q9Y219	Q9QYE5
RefSeq (mRNA)	NM_002226; NM_145159	NM_010588
RefSeq (protein)	NP_002217; NP_660142	NP_034718
Location (UCSC)	Chr 14: 105.14 – 105.17 Mb	Chr 12: 112.87 – 112.89 Mb
PubMed search
- Wikidata
View/Edit Human	View/Edit Mouse

Jagged-2 is a protein that in humans is encoded by the JAG2 gene.

== Function ==
The Notch signaling pathway is an intercellular signaling mechanism that is essential for proper embryonic development. Members of the Notch gene family encode transmembrane receptors that are critical for various cell fate decisions. The protein encoded by this gene is one of several ligands that activate Notch and related receptors. Two transcript variants encoding different isoforms have been found for this gene.

== Interactions ==
JAG2 has been shown to interact with NOTCH2.

MicroRNA miR-1280 has been shown to inhibit JAG2 expression.
