= Notch 2 =

Protein found in humans

NOTCH2
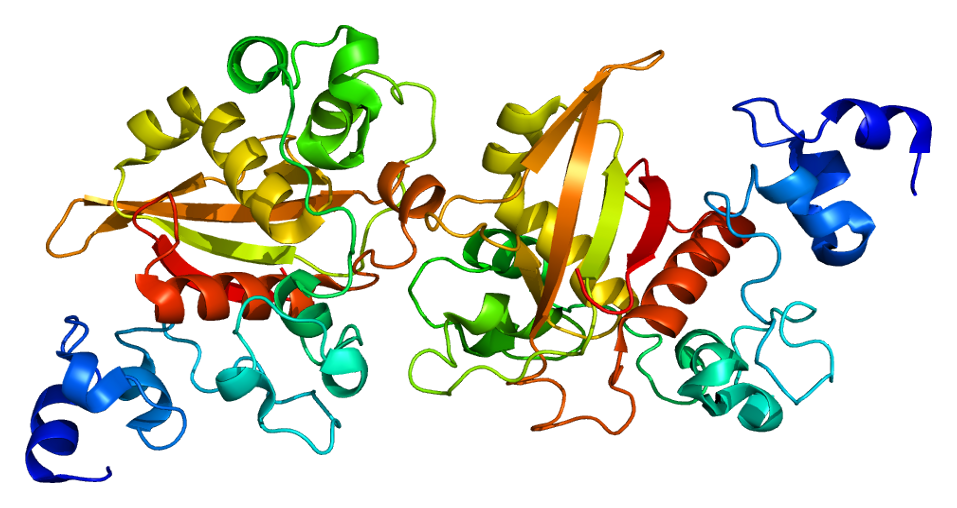

Identifiers
- Aliases: NOTCH2, AGS2, HJCYS, hN2, Notch-2, notch 2, notch receptor 2
- External IDs: OMIM: 600275; MGI: 97364; GeneCards: NOTCH2
Available structures
PDB	Ortholog search: PDBe RCSB
PDB	List of PDB id codes 2OO4

Gene location (Human)
Chr.	Chromosome 1 (human)
Band	1p12	Start	119,911,553 bp
Band	1p12	End	120,100,779 bp

Gene location (Mouse)
Chr.	Chromosome 3 (mouse)
Band	3 F2.2|3 42.42 cM	Start	97,920,843 bp
Band	3 F2.2|3 42.42 cM	End	98,057,677 bp
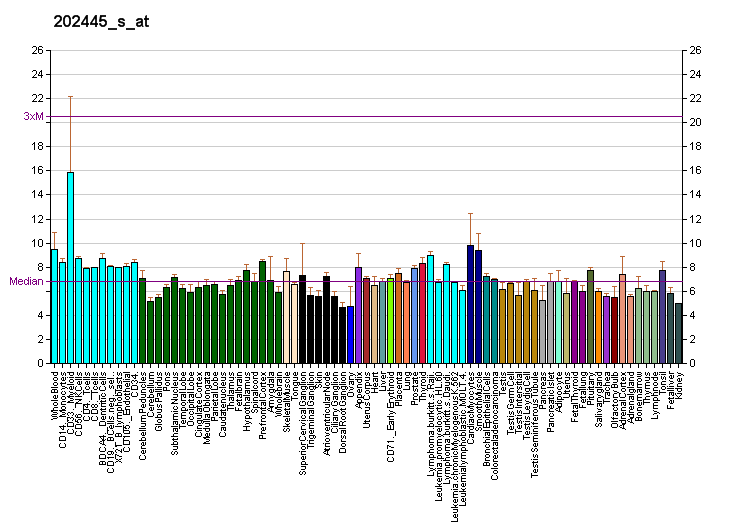

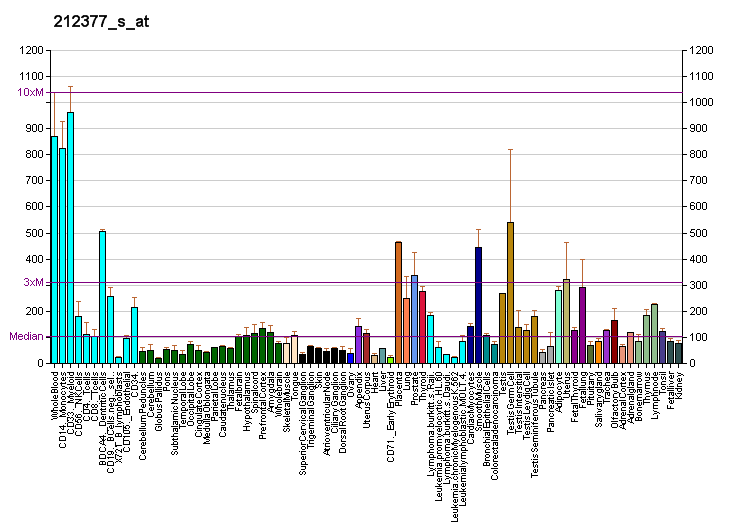

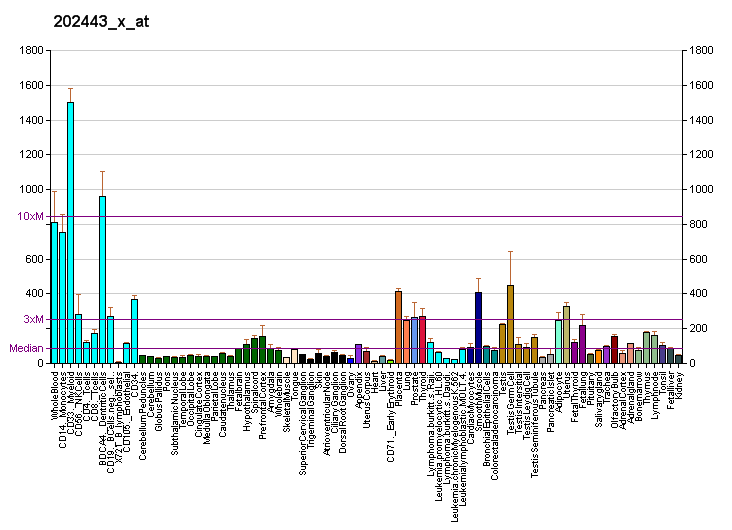
RNA expression pattern
Bgee	Human / Mouse (ortholog); Top expressed in: retinal pigment epithelium; skin of hip; skin of thigh; ventricular zone; synovial joint; caput epididymis; vulva; lactiferous duct; tail of epididymis; skin of arm / Top expressed in: ciliary body; retinal pigment epithelium; aortic valve; ascending aorta; vas deferens; vestibular sensory epithelium; cumulus cell; conjunctival fornix; epithelium of lens; molar; More reference expression data
BioGPS	More reference expression data
Gene ontology
Molecular function	calcium ion binding; protein binding; signaling receptor activity
Cellular component	cytoplasm; integral component of membrane; endoplasmic reticulum membrane; membrane; Golgi membrane; receptor complex; plasma membrane; integral component of plasma membrane; nucleoplasm; extracellular region; cell surface; nucleus
Biological process	Notch signaling pathway; cell differentiation; hemopoiesis; pulmonary valve morphogenesis; regulation of transcription, DNA-templated; positive regulation of Ras protein signal transduction; negative regulation of apoptotic process; marginal zone B cell differentiation; transcription, DNA-templated; nervous system development; stem cell population maintenance; multicellular organism development; atrial septum morphogenesis; regulation of developmental process; bone remodeling; animal organ morphogenesis; transcription initiation from RNA polymerase II promoter; Notch signaling involved in heart development; apoptotic process; cell fate determination; intracellular receptor signaling pathway; negative regulation of gene expression; negative regulation of growth rate; positive regulation of ERK1 and ERK2 cascade; regulation of osteoclast development; positive regulation of keratinocyte proliferation; regulation of actin cytoskeleton reorganization
Sources:Amigo / QuickGO
Orthologs
Databases	NCBI: entry; OMA: entry
Species	Human	Mouse
Entrez	4853	18129
Ensembl	ENSG00000134250	ENSMUSG00000027878
UniProt	Q04721	O35516
RefSeq (mRNA)	NM_001200001; NM_024408	NM_010928
RefSeq (protein)	NP_001186930; NP_077719	NP_035058
Location (UCSC)	Chr 1: 119.91 – 120.1 Mb	Chr 3: 97.92 – 98.06 Mb
PubMed search
- Wikidata
View/Edit Human	View/Edit Mouse

Neurogenic locus notch homolog protein 2 (Notch 2) is a protein that in humans is encoded by the NOTCH2 gene.

NOTCH2 is associated with Alagille syndrome and Hajdu–Cheney syndrome.

== Function ==
Notch 2 is a member of the notch family. Members of this type 1 transmembrane protein family share structural characteristics including an extracellular domain consisting of multiple epidermal growth factor-like (EGF) repeats, and an intracellular domain consisting of multiple, different domain types. Notch family members play a role in a variety of developmental processes by controlling cell fate decisions. The Notch signaling network is an evolutionarily conserved intercellular signaling pathway that regulates interactions between physically adjacent cells. In Drosophila, notch interaction with its cell-bound ligands (delta, serrate) establishes an intercellular signaling pathway that plays a key role in development. Homologues of the notch-ligands have also been identified in human, but precise interactions between these ligands and the human notch homologues remain to be determined. This protein is cleaved in the trans-Golgi network, and presented on the cell surface as a heterodimer. This protein functions as a receptor for membrane bound ligands, and may play a role in vascular, renal and hepatic development.

Mutations within the last coding exon of Notch2 that remove the PEST domain and escape the nonsense-mediated mRNA decay have been shown to be the main cause of the Hajdu–Cheney syndrome.

== Interactions ==
NOTCH2 has been shown to interact with:

- Delta-like 1
- GSK3B,
- JAG1, and
- JAG2.
