= Tiny Tickers =

British children's health charity

- a better start for tiny hearts
- Abbreviation: TT
- Formation: 1999
- Legal status: Registered charity
- Purpose: Improves the early detection and care of babies with serious heart conditions.
- Location: PO Box 369, Leeds, LS26 1FR
- Region served: UK
- Chief Executive: Jon Arnold
- Website: Tiny Tickers

Tiny Tickers is a charitable organisation in the United Kingdom that aims to improve the early detection, diagnosis, and care of babies with congenital heart disease through a combination of improving standards, providing specialised training and equipment, spreading awareness of congenital heart disease and supporting families.

== History ==
Tiny Tickers charity was founded in 1999 by fetal cardiologist Dr Helena Gardiner, when she realised many of the babies she was caring for could have been helped earlier. She had experience of, and was concerned about, the low prenatal detection rate of congenital heart disease (CHD).

== Activities ==
1 in every 125 babies born in the UK has a serious heart condition, which is around one baby born every two hours fighting congenital heart disease (CHD). Tiny Tickers is the only UK charity dedicated to the early detection and care of those babies. Spotting a heart defect early improves a baby's chances of survival and long-term quality of life. 1,000 heart babies leave UK hospitals every year with no-one knowing they have a life-threatening heart condition, putting them in grave danger of going into heart failure.

=== Sonographer Training ===
Tiny Tickers trains sonographers to have the skills and confidence to detect heart defects at pregnancy scans. The antenatal detection rate of heart defects in the UK has more than doubled from 23% to 53.5% since they started their work (NICOR).

=== Funding potentially life-saving equipment ===
Tiny Tickers also places potentially life-saving pulse oximetry machines in maternity wards to further improve the early detection of CHD.

Pulse oximetry testing helps to detect heart defects by measuring oxygen levels (oxygen saturation) in the blood. It uses a light sensor to assess the level of oxygen in the baby’s blood. Not every baby will be born displaying signs and symptoms and with this machine many more life-threatening defects can be detected.

At present, pulse oximetry testing is not a mandatory newborn test within NHS hospitals, and many maternity units do not have the means to introduce these life-saving machines. For these reasons, Tiny Tickers places pulse oximetry testing kits in maternity units across the UK which can then be used as part of standard newborn tests.

=== Raising Awareness ===
The charity teaches new parents and those working with babies to recognise the five key signs a baby may have an undiagnosed heart defect.

=== Supporting families ===
Another core part of the charity's work is supporting the families of babies with CHD. They provide detailed information, share CHD stories and connect heart parents through support group forums and peer support groups.

== Funding ==
Tiny Tickers receives no government funding. The charity is entirely funded by the generosity of individuals and grant makers.

== In the media ==
Tiny Tickers has featured in a number of high profile media campaigns, including a 2017 BBC One Lifeline appeal, and a 2023 Global's Make Some Noise appeal, where charity staff and supporters were interviewed on Heart Radio by Amanda Holden and Jamie Theakston.
