= Alagille syndrome =

- Other names: Alagille–Watson syndrome (ALGS), hepatic ductular hypoplasia
- Alagille syndrome is inherited in an autosomal dominant manner
- Specialty: Medical genetics, Gastroenterology, Cardiology
- Named after: Daniel Alagille

Alagille syndrome (ALGS) is a genetic disorder that affects primarily the liver and the heart. Problems associated with the disorder generally become evident in infancy or early childhood. The disorder is inherited in an autosomal dominant pattern, and the estimated prevalence of Alagille syndrome is 1 in every 30,000 to 1 in every 40,000 live births. It is named after the French pediatrician Daniel Alagille, who first described the condition in 1969. Children with Alagille syndrome live to the age of 18 in about 90% of the cases.

== Signs and symptoms ==
The severity of the disorder can vary within the same family, with symptoms ranging from so mild as to go unnoticed, to severe heart and/or liver disease that requires transplantation. It is uncommon, but Alagille syndrome can be a life-threatening disease with a mortality rate of 10%. The majority of deaths from ALGS are typically due to heart complications or chronic liver failure.

=== Liver ===
Signs and symptoms arising from liver damage in Alagille syndrome may include a yellowish tinge in the skin and the whites of the eyes (jaundice), itching (pruritus), pale stools (acholia), an enlarged liver (hepatomegaly), an enlarged spleen (splenomegaly) and deposits of cholesterol in the skin (xanthomas). A liver biopsy may indicate too few bile ducts (bile duct paucity) or, in some cases, the complete absence of bile ducts (biliary atresia). Bile duct paucity results in the reduced absorption of fat and fat-soluble vitamins (A, D, E and K), which may lead to rickets or a failure to thrive. Cirrhosis and eventual liver failure is fairly common among ALGS patients, and 15% of those with severe hepatic manifestations require a liver transplant. Hepatocellular cancer has been reported in a small number of cases, but it is extremely rare.

=== Heart ===
Tetralogy of Fallot is a common heart defect experienced in Alagille syndrome patients.

Cardiac manifestations are a common feature of Alagille syndrome, and can be found in a majority of patients diagnosed with the condition. The most frequently occurring structural abnormality is stenosis/hypoplasia of the branch pulmonary arteries. This pulmonary artery stenosis can range in severity, and may progress over time. If left untreated, patients may develop right ventricular hypertrophy, elevated right-sided pressures, and eventually right-sided heart failure. Some other cardiac abnormalities associated with Alagille syndrome include Tetralogy of Fallot, pulmonary valve stenosis, interrupted aortic arch, or atrial and ventricular septal defects, but these are seen less frequently. Clinical presentations of these cardiac lesions can range from subtle murmurs to significant cyanotic heart disease. The severity of cardiac involvement has been shown to directly correlate to prognosis and long-term outcomes for patients. If the right-sided outflow obstruction or congenital heart defect is considered too significant, then the risk of morbidity and mortality increases drastically. Thus, it is important for patients with cardiac symptoms to receive a comprehensive evaluation to start. Ongoing surveillance is needed going forward due to improved patient outcomes with early detection of cardiac disease and hemodynamic instability.

=== Other ===
Other presentations of Alagille's syndrome include butterfly vertebrae, ophthalmic defects, and distinct facial structures. The butterfly vertebrae can be detected with an x-ray, but there typically are no symptoms from this abnormality. Other skeletal defects common in ALGS patients are spina bifida and the fusion of vertebrae. Most of the ophthalmological defects affect the anterior chamber of the eyeball, including Axenfeld's anomaly and Rieger anomaly, but retina pigment changes are also common. These anomalies can be beneficial in diagnosing Alagille syndrome. Many people with ALGS have similar facial features, including a broad, prominent forehead, deep-set eyes, and a small pointed chin. While these distinct facial features are often presented in ALGS patients, the features are presumably not due to Alagille syndrome, but they are characteristic of patients with intrahepatic cholestatic liver disease. So while these facial characteristics are extremely common in ALGS patients, it is because many patients experience extreme liver complications or liver failure, but it is not caused by the disease itself. The kidneys may also be affected because the mutations in JAG1 and NOTCH2 often lead to renal dysplasia, deformed proximal tubules, or lipidosis caused by the hindrance of lipid metabolism.

== Genetics ==
ALGS is most commonly caused by a loss of function mutations in JAG1 (Jagged1), and less commonly in NOTCH2 (Notch homolog 2). The JAG1 mutation is either intragenic and found on chromosome 20p12, or it is a deletion of the entire JAG1 gene. Mutations in NOTCH2 are much less likely to cause Alagille syndrome, but the primary type of ALGS-causing mutation in NOTCH2 is a missense mutation. A missense mutation is a point mutation that changes one nucleotide, which results in a codon that codes for the wrong amino acid. Alagille syndrome is inherited in an autosomal dominant pattern, which means one copy of the altered gene is sufficient to cause the disorder. The "autosomal" aspect of the disease means that the gene mutation occurs in an autosome, which is one of the 44 chromosomes in the human body that is not a sex chromosome (chromosome X or Y). Although the majority of cases are due to the autosomal dominant gene, there have been reports of a rare, autosomal recessive version of the disease. In the autosomal recessive case, the ALGS patient must inherit two mutated genes: one from each parent. Although about 40% of the mutations are inherited from affected parents, most cases result from new, acquired mutations. These are caused by environmental factors that mutate one copy of the gene. Environmental factors that can result in gene mutations may include radiation such as ultraviolet rays from the sun, or chemicals such as benzene, which is found in cigarette smoke.

== Pathophysiology ==
JAG1 and NOTCH2 encode for proteins that are crucial to the notch gene–signaling cascade. Specifically, JAG1 encodes for a surface-binding ligand that regulates the notch signaling pathway. It plays a crucial role in cell signaling during embryonic development. If the pathway is disrupted due to mutations, an infant will not develop properly. Alagille syndrome causes bile duct paucity, which is characterized by narrow and malformed bile ducts. Bile duct paucity causes bile to build up in the liver, resulting in scarring of the liver which hinders the liver's normal functions, like blood filtration and drug metabolism.

== Diagnosis ==
Alagille syndrome can be extremely difficult to diagnose. While people are born with ALGS, it is almost always diagnosed later during childhood. The diagnosis can be difficult because the severity of the disease varies widely among patients. Some common clinical tests that are run in order to diagnose the disease include vertebral x-rays, heart exams to detect any defects such as a heart murmur, and a liver biopsy to detect liver disease or any precursors. If a patient presents with multiple symptoms such as jaundice, heart murmur, and the characteristic facial features discussed above (deep set eyes, broad brow, etc.), they are likely to be diagnosed with Alagille syndrome. A more calculated and specific diagnosis can be done with genetic testing. Next-generation sequencing can be utilized to detect single nucleotide polymorphisms (SNPs) in the affected gene(s). Multiplex ligation-dependent probe amplification (MLPA) can detect large deletions and/or insertions and microarray comparative genomic hybridization is used to improve the accuracy of MLPA.

It is important to distinguish Alagille syndrome from biliary atresia because the latter benefits from a Kasai procedure in the early postnatal period, whereas this operation would make Alagille syndrome worse.. Indirect features on ultrasound of biliary atresia include abnormal and diminutive gallbladder shape, the triangular cord sign, and hepatic artery enlargement, though these can overlap with Alagille syndrome.

== Treatment ==
Early treatment is possible once the disease is diagnosed. Treatments of Alagille syndrome typically involve medications, therapies, and/or surgical procedures. All treatments aim to improve bile excretion from the liver, reduce pain caused by the disease, and help improve nutritional deficiencies. Diet can also be a crucial factor in improving quality of life when living with ALGS.

=== Medication ===
Several medications are used to improve bile flow, including ursodiol (Actigall or Urso). These medications differ in their rates of success. Certain drugs may be used to reduce itching (pruritus), such as cholestyramine and rifampin. While these medications can reduce pruritus, the itching often is reduced when bile flow is improved via ursodiol or liver transplant.

Many patients with Alagille syndrome have nutritional and/or malabsorption issues which often hinders normal growth. Patients benefit from vitamin A, D, E, and K supplements because the reduced bile flow makes it difficult to absorb and utilize these vitamins. A high-calorie diet is very important, and often requires a gastrostomy tube to maintain the high caloric intake.

Maralixibat (Livmarli) was approved for medical use in the United States in September 2021.

=== Surgery ===
Surgery is common in more severe cases on Alagille syndrome, especially for patients with liver disease or end-stage liver failure. Liver transplants can either be a complete liver transplant from a deceased organ donor, or a partial transplant from a living donor.

Partial biliary diversion has been used to significantly reduce pruritus, jaundice, and xanthoma caused by poor bile flow in patients with bile duct paucity. A portion of the bile produced by the liver is directed through a surgically created stoma into a plastic pouch on the patient's lower right abdomen. The pouch is periodically drained as it fills with bile. Patients with biliary atresia may require a Kasai procedure to improve bile drainage; however, later liver transplantation is still often necessary.

== See also ==
- Progressive familial intrahepatic cholestasis
