= Targeted analysis sequencing =

DNA sequencing technique

Targeted analysis sequencing (sometimes called target amplicon sequencing) (TAS) is a next-generation DNA sequencing technique focusing on amplicons and specific genes. It is useful in population genetics since it can target a large diversity of organisms. The TAS approach incorporates bioinformatics techniques to produce a large amount of data at a fraction of the cost involved in Sanger sequencing. TAS is also useful in DNA studies because it allows for amplification of the needed gene area via PCR, which is followed by next-gen sequencing platforms. Next-gen sequencing use shorter reads 50–400 base pairs which allow for quicker sequencing of multiple specimens. Thus TAS allows for a cheaper sequencing approach that is easily scalable and offers both reliability and speed.
