= Anomalous pulmonary venous connection =

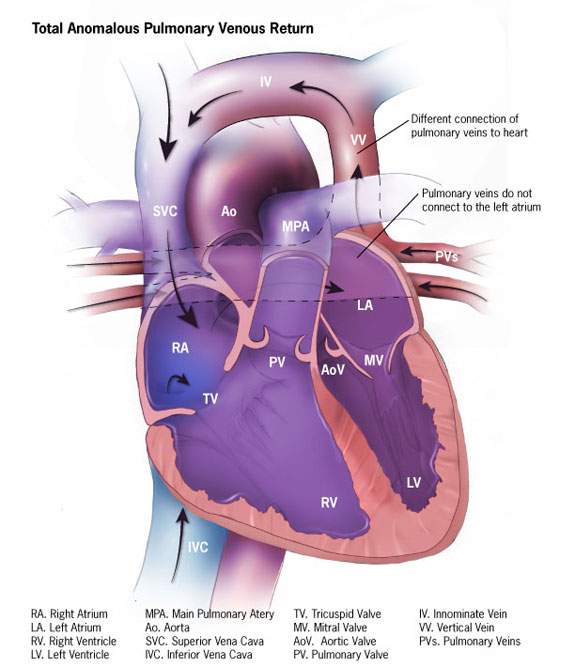
- Illustration of total anomalous pulmonary venous connection
- Specialty: Medical genetics

Anomalous pulmonary venous connection (or anomalous pulmonary venous drainage or anomalous pulmonary venous return) is a congenital heart defect of the pulmonary veins. It can involve either all four pulmonary veins being incorrectly positioned (total anomalous pulmonary venous connection) or only some veins being incorrectly positioned (partial anomalous pulmonary venous connection).

== Signs and symptoms ==
- Right ventricular heave
- Loud S1
- Fixed split S2
- S3 gallop
- Systolic ejection murmur at left upper sternal border
- Cardiomegaly
- Right ventricular hypertrophy and right axis deviation on ECG
- Cyanosis, tachypnea and dyspnea, since the overloaded pulmonary circuit can cause pulmonary edema
- Cottage-loaf sign, that is, chest X-ray appearance similar to a cottage loaf, also known as the 'snow man' sign or 'figure of 8' sign.

== Total anomalous pulmonary venous connection (TAPVR) ==
Total anomalous pulmonary venous connection, also known as total anomalous pulmonary venous return, is a rare cyanotic congenital heart defect in which the pulmonary veins drain into the right side of the heart instead of the left, as is usually seen. This can happen within the heart (intracardiac) where it drains into the coronary sinus or right atrium, or below it (infracardiac) where it drains into the liver at the portal or hepatic vein, or above it, (supracardiac), where it drains into the superior vena cava. The anomalous connection causes low blood oxygenation and limitation of venous return to the heart. Survival with this condition depends on the presence of an atrial septal defect (ASD). This defect makes it possible for blood to get to the left side of the heart and out to the rest of the body.

=== Diagnosis ===
The diagnosis of TAPVC is dependent upon whether or not there is an obstruction (blood cannot drain into the heart from the pulmonary veins, which increases the pressure in the lungs).

TAPVC is often diagnosed by echocardiogram, or a heart ultrasound, after birth. It can be picked up prenatally, but is not frequently detected since there is little blood flow through the pulmonary veins. This is because the fetus gets its oxygen from the mother, not their lungs.

Other tests can be performed, such as an electrocardiogram, which will show an enlarged right side of the heart, or a chest x-ray, which will also show an enlarged right heart. If obstructed, chest x-ray may show a ground-glass appearance due to pulmonary edema resulting from increased pressure in the obstructed pulmonary veins.

TAPVC with obstruction will clinically present with low blood oxygen saturation, shortness of breath, fast breathing, and cyanosis, or a blue-ish tint to the skin.

=== Treatment ===
Cases of TAPVC with obstruction are considered a surgical emergency.

In TAPVC without obstruction, surgical redirection can be performed within the first month of life. The operation is performed under general anesthesia. The four pulmonary veins are reconnected to the left atrium, and any associated heart defects such as atrial septal defect, ventricular septal defect, patent foramen ovale, and/or patent ductus arteriosus are surgically closed. With obstruction, surgery should be undertaken urgently. PGE1 should be given because a patent ductus arteriosus allows oxygenated blood to go from the circulation of the right heart to the systemic circulation.

== Partial anomalous pulmonary venous connection (PAPVR) ==
A Partial anomalous pulmonary venous connection (or Partial anomalous pulmonary venous drainage or Partial anomalous pulmonary venous return) is a congenital defect where the left atrium is the point of return for the blood from some (but not all) of the pulmonary veins.

It is less severe than total anomalous pulmonary venous connection which is a life-threatening anomaly requiring emergent surgical correction, usually diagnosed in the first few days of life. Partial anomalous venous connection may be diagnosed at any time from birth to old age. The severity of symptoms, and thus the likelihood of diagnosis, varies significantly depending on the amount of blood flow through the anomalous connections. In less severe cases, with smaller amounts of blood flow, diagnosis may be delayed until adulthood, when it can be confused with other causes of pulmonary hypertension. There is also evidence that a significant number of mild cases are never diagnosed, or diagnosed incidentally. It is associated with other vascular anomalies, and some genetic syndromes such as Turner syndrome.

=== Diagnosis ===
It can be diagnosed with CT scan, angiography, transesophageal echocardiography, or cardiac MRI.

=== Treatment ===
It is sometimes treated with surgery, which involves rerouting blood from the right atrium into the left atrium with a patch or use of the Warden procedure. However, interest is increasing in catheter-based interventional approaches, as well as medical therapy for less severe cases.

== Pathophysiology ==
To understand the different types of anomalous pulmonary venous connection, it is important to establish the background in which normal fetal vasculature develops.

During embryonic development, the lungs start as outgrowths from the foregut and share its splanchnic vascular plexus. At around 25 to 27 days of gestation, there are no direct links to the heart. By 27 to 29 days of gestation, the primitive pulmonary vein begins to form as an outgrowth from the left atrium and eventually connects with the primitive pulmonary venous system.
