= Pulmonary vein =

Veins that transfer oxygenated blood from the lungs to the heart

- Anterior (frontal) view of the opened heart. White arrows indicate normal blood flow.

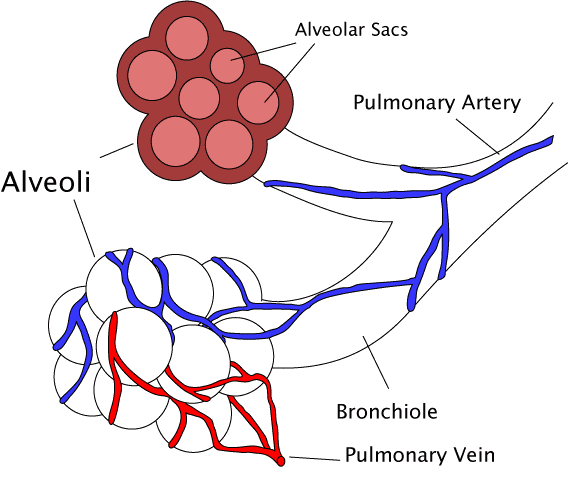
- Diagram of the alveoli with both cross-section and external view.

Details
- Precursor: Truncus arteriosus
- System: Circulatory system
- Drains from: Lungs
- Drains to: Left atrium
- Artery: Pulmonary artery

Identifiers
- Latin: venae pulmonales
- MeSH: D011667
- TA98: A12.3.02.001
- TA2: 4107
- FMA: 66643

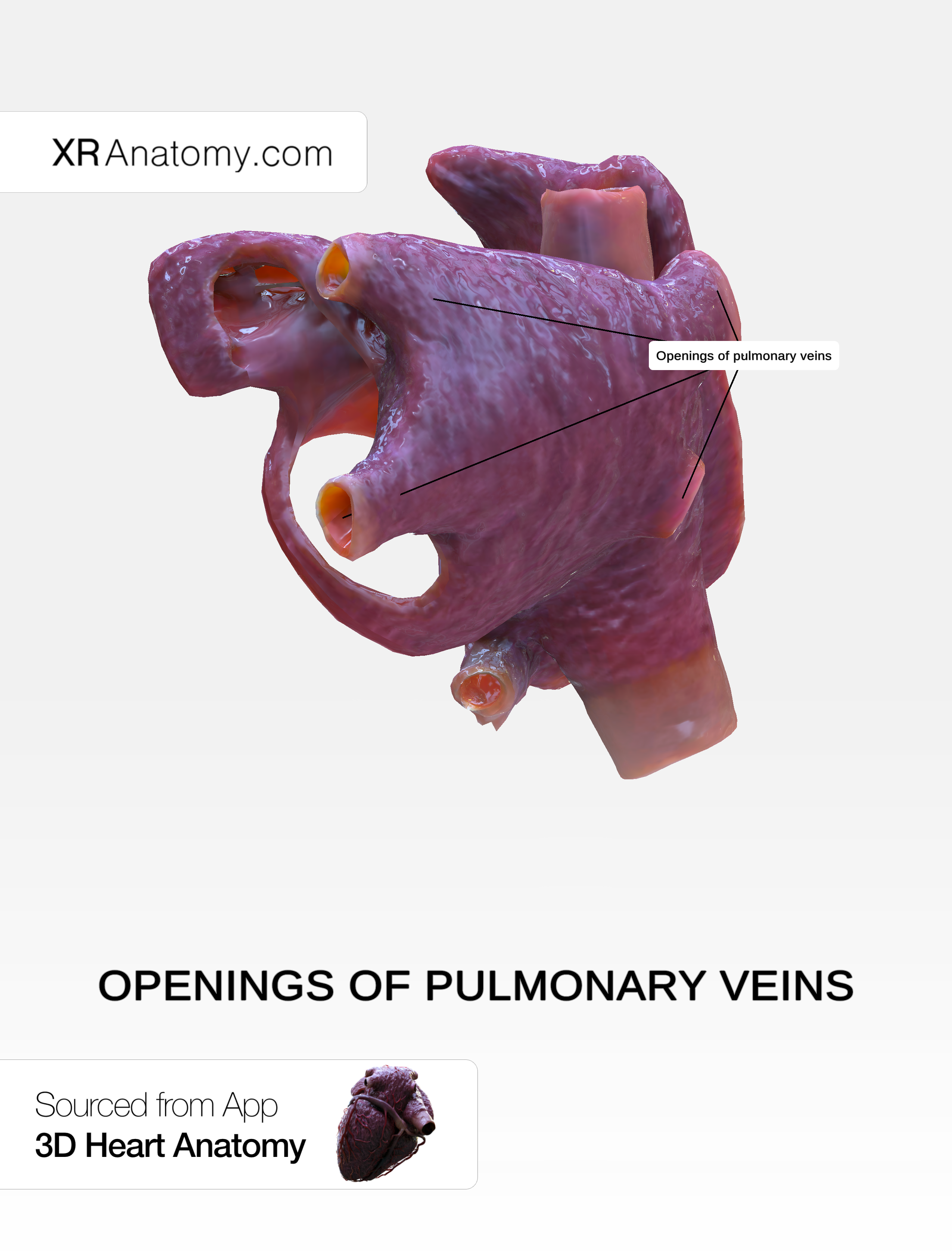

The pulmonary veins are the veins that transfer oxygenated blood from the lungs to the heart. The largest pulmonary veins are the four main pulmonary veins, two from each lung that drain into the left atrium of the heart. The pulmonary veins are part of the pulmonary circulation.

== Structure ==
There are four main pulmonary veins, two from each lung – an inferior and a superior main vein, emerging from each hilum. The main pulmonary veins receive blood from three or four feeding veins in each lung, and drain into the left atrium. The peripheral feeding veins do not follow the bronchial tree. They run between the pulmonary segments from which they drain the blood.

At the root of the lung, the right superior pulmonary vein lies in front of and a little below the pulmonary artery; the inferior is situated at the lowest part of the lung hilum. Behind the pulmonary artery is the bronchus. The right main pulmonary veins (contains oxygenated blood) pass behind the right atrium and superior vena cava; the left in front of the descending thoracic aorta.

=== Variation ===
Occasionally the three lobar veins on the right side remain separate, and not infrequently the two left lobar veins end by a common opening into the left atrium. Therefore, the number of pulmonary veins opening into the left atrium can vary between three and five in the healthy population.

The two left lobar veins may be united as a single pulmonary vein in about 25% of people; the two right veins may be united in about 3%.

== Function ==
The pulmonary veins play an essential role in respiration, by receiving blood that has been oxygenated in the alveoli and returning it to the left atrium.

== Clinical significance ==
As part of the pulmonary circulation they carry oxygenated blood back to the heart, as opposed to the veins of the systemic circulation which carry deoxygenated blood. By definition, a vein is a blood vessel that carries blood to the heart, whether oxygenated or deoxygenated.

A groundbreaking study published in 1998 identified the pulmonary vein as the predominant trigger for atrial fibrillation. Atrial fibrillation frequently results from bursts of tachycardia that originate in muscle bundles extending from the atrium to the pulmonary veins. Pulmonary vein anatomy is highly variable among atrial fibrillation patients. Pulmonary vein isolation by transcatheter ablation can restore sinus rhythm. As atrial fibrillation becomes more persistent, the junction between the pulmonary veins and the left atrium becomes less of an initiator and the left atrium becomes an independent source of arrhythmias. Pulmonary vein isolation ablation technology has used thermal methods (radiofrequency ablation or cryoablation), which can damage adjacent tissues, notably the esophagus, lung or phrenic nerve. Electroporation, however, eliminates the risk of thermal damage. Atrial fibrillation most often recurs after ablation because of pulmonary vein reconnection.

On chest X-ray, the diameters of pulmonary veins increases from upper to lower lobes, from 3 mm at the first intercoastal space, to 6 mm just above the diaphragm.

A rare genetic defect of the pulmonary veins can cause them to drain into the pulmonary circulation in whole or in part, this is known as a total anomalous pulmonary venous connection (or drainage), or partial anomalous pulmonary connection, respectively.

== Additional images ==
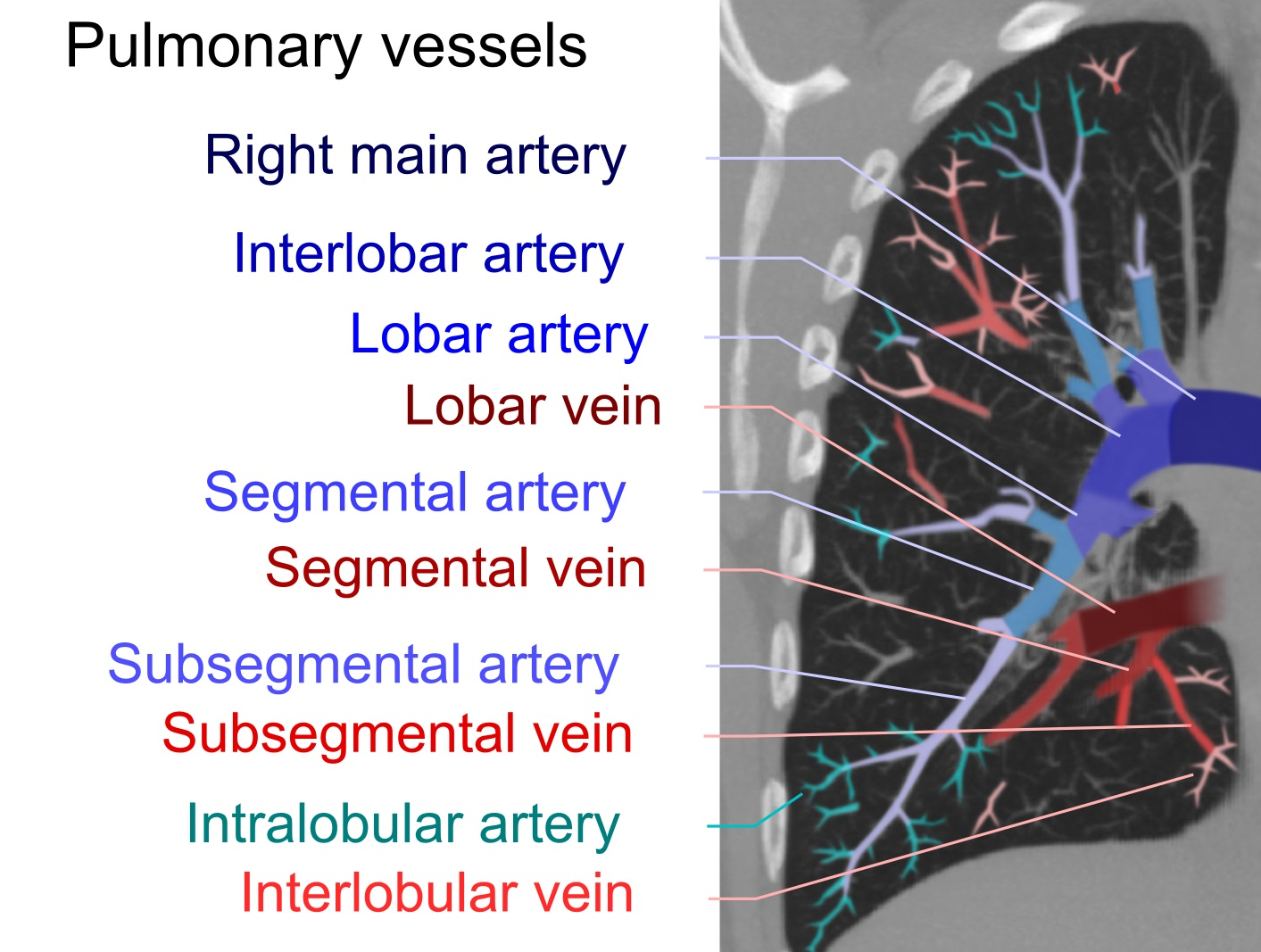
Computed tomography of a normal lung, with different levels of pulmonary veins.

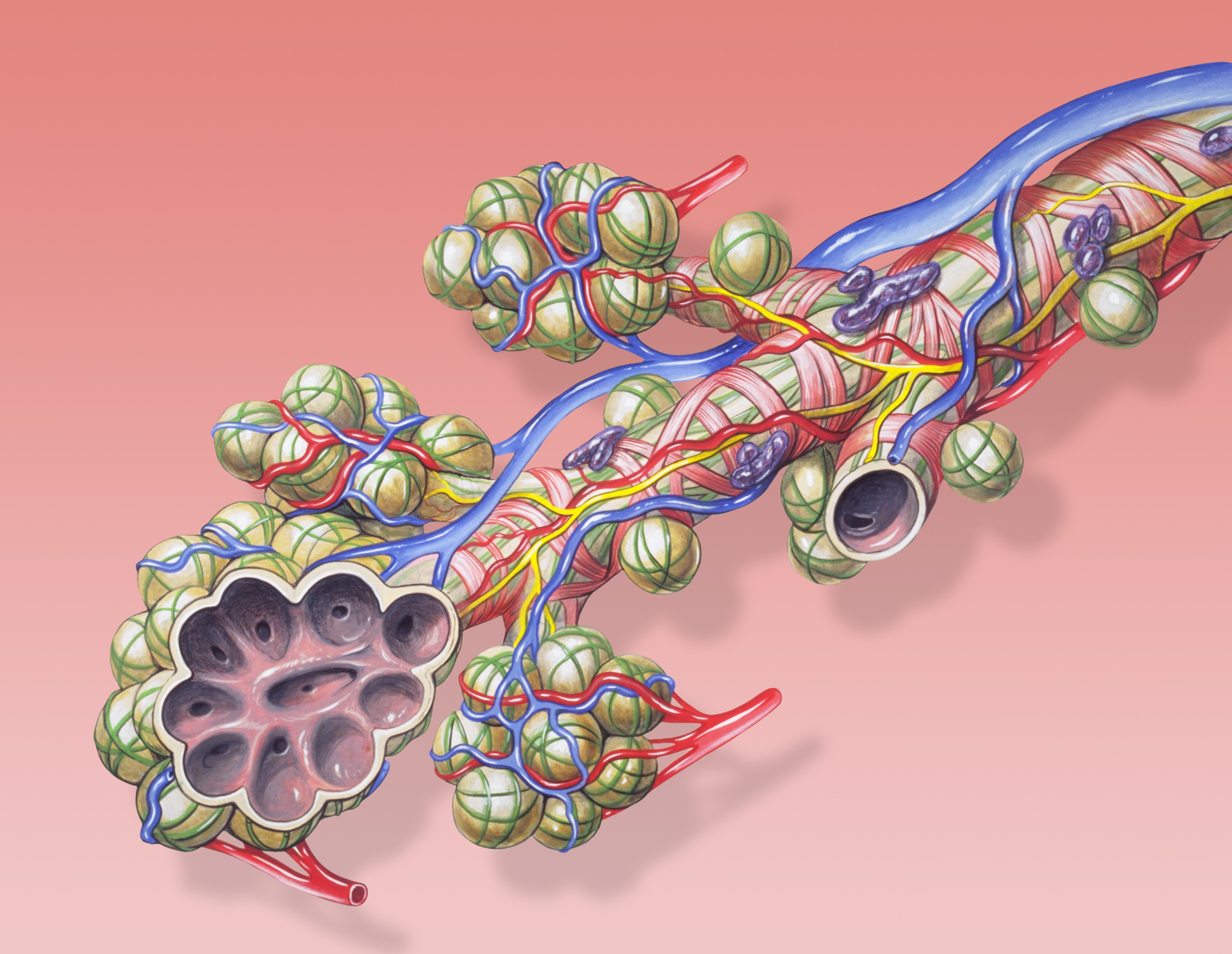
Bronchial anatomy

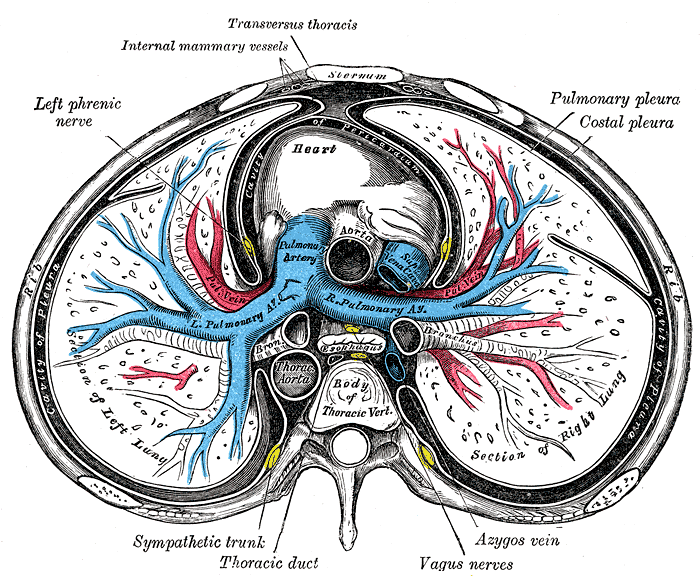
Transverse section of thorax, showing relations of pulmonary artery.

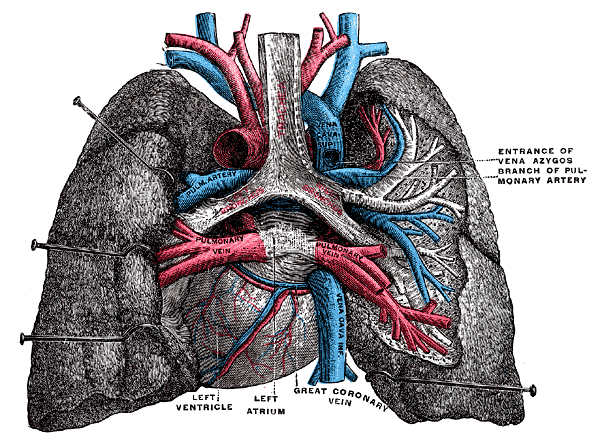
Pulmonary vessels, seen in a dorsal view of the heart and lungs.
