= Conditional gene knockout =

Conditional gene knockout is a technique used to eliminate a specific gene in a certain tissue, such as the liver. This technique is useful to study the role of individual genes in living organisms. It differs from traditional gene knockout because it targets specific genes at specific times rather than being deleted from beginning of life. Using the conditional gene knockout technique eliminates many of the side effects from traditional gene knockout. In traditional gene knockout, embryonic death from a gene mutation can occur, and this prevents scientists from studying the gene in adults. Some tissues cannot be studied properly in isolation, so the gene must be inactive in a certain tissue while remaining active in others. With this technology, scientists are able to knockout genes at a specific stage in development and study how the knockout of a gene in one tissue affects the same gene in other tissues.

== Technique ==
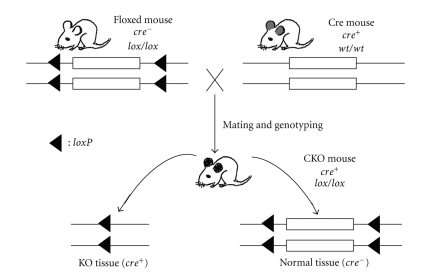
Diagram showing how to generate a conditional knockout mouse: A mouse containing the Cre gene and a mouse containing the lox gene were bred to generate a conditional knockout for a particular gene of interest. The mice do not naturally express Cre recombinase or lox sites, but they have been engineered to express these gene products to create the desirable offspring.

The most commonly used technique is the Cre-lox recombination system. The Cre recombinase enzyme specifically recognizes two lox (loci of recombination) sites within DNA and causes recombination between them. During recombination two strands of DNA exchange information. This recombination will cause a deletion or inversion of the genes between the two lox sites, depending on their orientation. An entire gene can be removed to inactivate it. This whole system is inducible so a chemical can be added to knock genes out at a specific time. Two of the most commonly used chemicals are tetracycline, which activates transcription of the Cre recombinase gene and tamoxifen, which activates transport of the Cre recombinase protein to the nucleus. Only a few cell types express Cre recombinase and no mammalian cells express it so there is no risk of accidental activation of lox sites when using conditional gene knockout in mammals. Figuring out how to express Cre-recombinase in an organism tends to be the most difficult part of this technique.

== Uses ==
The conditional gene knockout method is often used to model human diseases in other mammals. It has increased scientists’ ability to study diseases, such as cancer, that develop in specific cell types or developmental stages. It is known that mutations in the BRCA1 gene are linked to breast cancer. Scientists used conditional gene knockout to delete the BRCA1 allele in mammary gland tissue in mice and found that it plays an important role in tumour suppression.

A specific gene in mouse brain thought to be involved in the onset of Alzheimer's disease which codes for the enzyme cyclin-dependent kinase 5 (Cdk5) was knocked out. Such mice were found to be 'smarter' than normal mice and were able to handle complex tasks more intelligently compared to 'normal' mice bred in the laboratory.

== Knockout Mouse Project (KOMP) ==
Conditional gene knockouts in mice are often used to study human diseases because many genes produce similar phenotypes in both species. For the past 100 years laboratory mouse genetics have been used for this because mice are mammals that are physiologically similar enough to humans to generate qualitative testing. These two have such similar genes that out of 4000 studied genes, only 10 were found in one species but not the other. All mammals shared the same common ancestor approximately 80 million years ago; technically speaking, all genomes of mammals are comparatively similar. However, in comparison between mice and humans, their protein-coding regions of the genomes are 85% identical and have similarities between 99% of their homologs. These similarities result in similar phenotypes to be expressed between the two species.[8][12] Their genes are very alike to those of humans with 99% having homologs being similar. Along with producing similar phenotypes as well making them very promising candidates for conditional gene knockouts.[8] The goal of KOMP is to create knockout mutations in the embryonic stem cells for each of the 20,000 protein coding genes in mice. The genes are knocked out because this is the best way to study their function and learn more about their role in human diseases. There are two main strategies to conditional gene knockout and those are gene targeting or homologous recombination and gene trapping. Both methods usually have a modified viral vector or a linear fragment as the mode of transportation of the artificial DNA into the target ES cell. The cells then grow in a petri dish for several days and are inserted into the early-stage embryos. Lastly, the embryos are placed into the adult female's uterus where it can grow into its offspring.[9] Some alleles in this project cannot be knocked out using traditional methods and require the specificity of the conditional gene knockout technique. Other combinatorial methods are needed to knockout the last remaining alleles. Conditional gene knockout is a time-consuming procedure and there are additional projects focusing on knocking out the remaining mouse genes. The KOMP project contributor, Oliver Smithies, arguably provided the biggest scientific impact on this gene targeting. Oliver received the Nobel prize for medicine due to a technique allowing the ability to identify functions in genes and how to use the 'knockout' method to delete certain genes. Unfortunately, the pioneer in gene targeting died at the age of 91 on January 10, 2017.[11] The KOMP projected was started in 2006 and is still ongoing today. The KOMP Repository provides incentives to those partaking in the projects to return feedback to them and those who meet specific criteria can be refunded 50% of the cost of their research cells.[10]
