= XIRP2 =

Protein-coding gene in humans

Identifiers
- Aliases: XIRP2, CMYA3, xin actin binding repeat containing 2
- External IDs: OMIM: 609778; MGI: 2685198; GeneCards: XIRP2
Available structures
PDB	Ortholog search: PDBe RCSB
PDB	List of PDB id codes 4F14

Gene location (Human)
Chr.	Chromosome 2 (human)
Band	2q24.3	Start	166,888,480 bp
Band	2q24.3	End	167,259,753 bp

Gene location (Mouse)
Chr.	Chromosome 2 (mouse)
Band	2|2 C1.3	Start	67,004,178 bp
Band	2|2 C1.3	End	67,356,959 bp
RNA expression pattern
Bgee	Human / Mouse (ortholog); Top expressed in: deltoid muscle; biceps brachii; Skeletal muscle tissue of rectus abdominis; quadriceps femoris muscle; vastus lateralis muscle; tibialis anterior muscle; Skeletal muscle tissue of biceps brachii; myocardium of left ventricle; body of tongue; muscle of thigh / Top expressed in: muscle of thigh; skeletal muscle tissue; ventricle of the heart; quadriceps femoris muscle; interventricular septum; left ventricle; zone of skin; esophagus; lip; superior frontal gyrus; More reference expression data
BioGPS	n/a
Gene ontology
Molecular function	alpha-actinin binding; actin binding; actin filament binding
Cellular component	cell junction; Z discdkac; stress fiber; focal adhesion; filamentous actin
Biological process	development of the heart; cell-cell junction organization; cardiac muscle tissue morphogenesis; ventricular septum development; actin cytoskeleton organization; biological process
Sources:Amigo / QuickGO
Orthologs
Databases	NCBI: entry; OMA: entry
Species	Human	Mouse
Entrez	129446	241431
Ensembl	ENSG00000163092	ENSMUSG00000027022
UniProt	A4UGR9	Q4U4S6
RefSeq (mRNA)	NM_152381; NM_001079810; NM_001199143; NM_001199144; NM_001199145	NM_001024618; NM_001083919
RefSeq (protein)	NP_001073278; NP_001186072; NP_001186073; NP_001186074; NP_689594	NP_001019789; NP_001077388
Location (UCSC)	Chr 2: 166.89 – 167.26 Mb	Chr 2: 67 – 67.36 Mb
PubMed search
- Wikidata
View/Edit Human	View/Edit Mouse

Xin actin-binding repeat-containing protein 2 is a protein that in humans is encoded by the XIRP2 gene.
