= PEST sequence =

Peptide sequence in short-lived proteins

AN OVERVIEW

PEST sequences are peptide sequences that are rich in Proline (P), Glutamic acid (E), Serine (S), and Threonine (T). PEST sequences regulate enzyme levels by changing the rate at which the enzyme is degraded. They are known for their short half-life, which is often less than two hours. Ten different proteins with half-lives less than two hours were tested. With one exception, every single one of them contained one or more PEST sequences. 35 proteins with a half-life between twenty and two hundred twenty hours were tested, and only three contained a PEST region. This study suggested that PEST regions are directly correlated with the rapid proteolysis of the proteins in which they exist. Common applications of PEST sequences include oncogenes, transcription factors, protein kinases, enzymes and key components of signaling pathways.

STRUCTURE AND FUNCTION

A PEST region ranges in length from twelve to sixty residues, and it contains at least one P, one E or D, and one S or T. Other than simply containing the necessary residues, all PEST sequences have a few more things in common. In most PEST sequences, the proline residue is embedded in a hydrophobic pocket. This means that the proline residue will have nonpolar residues, such as glycine (G) and alanine (A), on either side of it. Also, they are all surface loops or terminal extensions, which allows them to be accessible for modifications. PEST sequences are predominantly hydrophilic, so they extrude from the hydrophobic pocket they inhabit. PEST sequences can be found anywhere on a polypeptide, but they are typically found near the N-terminus or the C-terminus.

DETECTION

A tool was developed to determine the location and strength of PEST sequences, and it is called PEST-FIND. PEST-FIND examines polypeptides and assigns them a “PEST score” based on the strength of the PEST sequence in the polypeptide. PEST scores range from -50 to +50, with +50. The more P, E, S, and T residues, the higher the Pest score will be or the closer it will be to +50. A common issue with this computer program is that the PEST score does not help differentiate the pattern of amino acids. Peptide sequences with different patterns of P, E, S, and T may have the same PEST score. Some common PEST patterns include PSEE, PSESEP, PSS, and PY. The Y in PY is the abbreviation for Tyrosine and acts as an adequate substitute because it similarly serves as a site for phosphorylation (post-translational modification).

FEATURES OF PEST SEQUENCES

The function of a PEST sequence as a proteolytic marker of degradation was proven through the deletion of PEST sequences from proteins with short half-lives. In a specific case, the PEST sequence was cleaved from mouse ODC (mODC) around the C-terminus. The shortened protein was found to be almost ten times as stable as the native enzyme. This test was repeated in both yeast and cyclins, yielding the same results. The function of PEST regions was also proven through a single amino acid change. If a non-PEST amino acid replaces a proline, glutamic acid, serine, or threonine (especially proline and threonine), degradation is significantly inhibited. Not only do these studies prove the function, but they also indicate that the PEST regions are transplantable. The theory of transplantable PEST sequences was further tested by taking the C-terminus PEST regions from mODC and transferring them to Trypanosoma ODC. The Trypanosoma ODC became a rapidly degraded protein, proving the theory. This transplantation was replicated across a couple more stable proteins, and, similarly, each was quickly degraded.

Some PEST sequences are constitutive proteolytic signals, whereas others are conditional. There are many varying examples of conditional PEST proteolytic signals, all with different paths to activation. One of the most well-known examples is phytochrome. Before phytochrome is activated, it exists in its dark form with a half-life of 100 hours. Upon light absorption, the half-life drops from 100 hours to 1 hour. The light absorption causes isomerization of the protein between the amino acids 323 and 361. This isomerization reveals the PEST sequence that had been hidden in the original isomer, and degradation is initiated.

The current hypothesis for the pathway that PEST sequences use is the ubiquitin-26S proteasome-mediated degradation. This pathway works by marking the protein with ubiquitin molecules that the 26S proteasome recognizes. The 26S proteasome, powered by ATP, unfolds the tagged protein and breaks down the targeted area into smaller peptides.

PEST-CONTAINING NUCLEAR PROTEINS (PCNP) AND MODERN APPLICATIONS

A nuclear protein is a protein found in the nucleus of a cell, and it plays a crucial role in the execution of nuclear functions, such as signal transduction and gene regulation. A PEST-containing nuclear protein (PCNP) is a small nuclear protein with 178 amino acid residues that contains two PEST sequences. PCNPs participate in cell regulation as well as the intervention of tumor growth. PCNP is found to be highly expressed in some malignant tumors (cervical, rectal, and lung cancer). Correlations have been found between PCNPs and prominent signaling pathways, such as the PI3K/AKT/mTOR pathway, a key dysregulation pathway of many cancers, as well as an essential regulator of cell proliferation, metabolism, and cell death (apoptosis). Upregulation of PCNPs increases the expression levels of all three pathways in the PI3K/AKT/mTOR pathway. This correlation becomes particularly relevant in lung adenocarcinoma cells, as the upregulation of PI3K/AKT/mTOR in these cells promotes both autophagy and tumor growth. Downregulation inhibits the growth of lung adenocarcinoma cells. However, upregulation of PCNPs was found to reduce cell proliferation of neuroblastoma cells. Downregulation of PCNPs in neuroblastoma cells reversed this effect.

PCNPs are also involved in the epithelial mesenchymal transition (EMT) pathway, a pathway marking the transition of epithelial stem cells to metastatic cells. Through this pathway, PCNPs promote ovarian tumor growth by triggering the EMT pathway. The EMT pathway is interlinked with the Wnt/β-catenin pathway, another pathway in which PCNPs play a role. Upregulation of PCNP in ovarian cancer cells, through the Wnt pathway, promotes metastatic cell proliferation. This occurs through the mechanism of a PCNP binding to β-catenin, which causes the nuclear translocation of β-catenin, thereby further activating the Wnt/β-catenin signaling pathway. The vice versa applies; downregulation of PCNP decreased the cell growth and migration in ovarian cancer cells. Due to the research on PCNPs in different carcinomas, this has become a new target for therapeutic cancer treatments.
