= Occlusive vasculopathy =

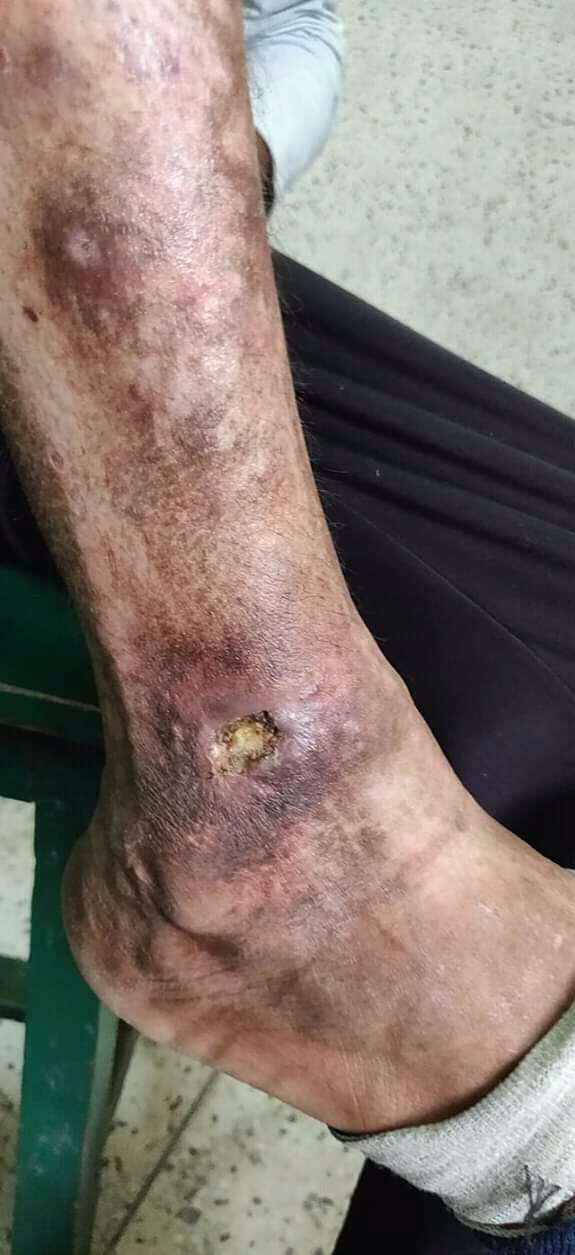
- Photo of a leg affected by livedoid vasculopathy, a type of occlusive vasculopathy.
- Pronunciation: /əˈkluːsɪv væskjəˈlɒpəθi/
- Symptoms: Retiform purpura, skin lesions, nodules, ulcerations, necrosis, livedo racemosa
- Types: Vascular coagulopathy, systemic coagulopathy, platelet plugging, cold-related agglutination, embolization, and others
- Treatment: Wound control, antithrombotic therapy, etc.

Occlusive vasculopathy (from Latin vāsculum "vasculo-", meaning "vessel", and Ancient Greek πάθεια "-pathy", meaning "disorder of") is a group of vascular disorders with a blockage in one or more blood vessels caused by excessive clotting of blood. A broad range of underlying causes are found, hypercoagulability for example . The main symptoms of these disorders are primarily retiform purpura, which are branching purple patches on the skin resulting from obstructed blood flow and oxygen supply, skin lesions, nodules, ulcerations, cell death (necrosis), and livedo racemosa, which is a purple net-like pattern of discoloration.

While there is no single recognised classification system for occlusive vasculopathy, recent research does so by its different underlying causes. A diagnosis of occlusive vasculopathy can be confirmed via skin biopsy, and is treated by removing the blockage using specific methods that address the root cause of each case and wound management. Historically, occlusive vasculopathy has frequently been confused with vasculitis, where inflammation damages blood vessels (occlusive vasculopathy is non-inflammatory), causing misdiagnoses and wrongful treatment.

== Classification ==
Currently, there is no one unified way to classify the different occlusive vasculopathy disorders due to differing classification principles, failure to distinguish between vasculitis and vasculopathy, as well as difficulty in comparing organ-specific features in systemic cases. There have been attempts to algorithmically classify the disorders by 1) differentiating vasculopathies affecting small- versus medium-sized blood vessels 2) categorizing subtypes within small- and medium-sized blood vessel vasculopathies respectively 3) further categorizing by looking at the life cycles of the vasculopathies.

An alternative way of classification does so using their various underlying causes (etiology), grouping them into the categories: vascular coagulopathy, systemic coagulopathy, platelet plugging, cold-related agglutination, embolization, and others.

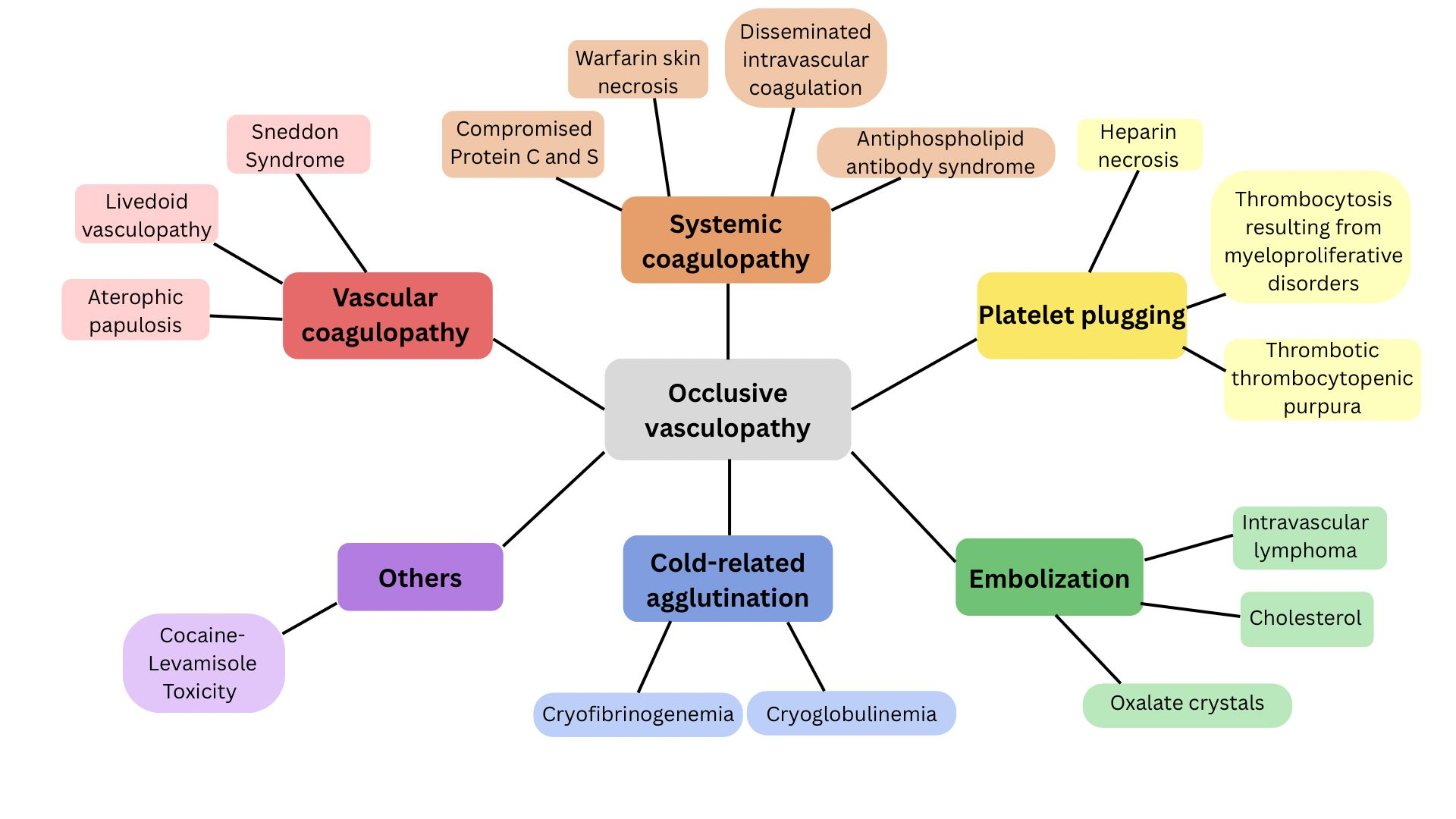
Diagram of occlusive vasculopathy classification by etiology.

=== Vascular coagulopathy ===
Compared to systemic coagulopathy, vascular coagulopathy is more localized.

- Sneddon syndrome describes an idiopathic livedo reticularis (similar to the previously described racemosa) or livedo racemosa with recurring lesions on the nervous and vascular systems due to blockages in small and medium sized arteries mainly in young women.
- Livedoid vasculopathy is a chronic and painful blood clot blockage caused by interplay of various dysfunctions in coagulation that mainly affects the lower limbs.
- Atrophic papulosis is a rare genetic disorder characterized by multi-organ vasculopathy. It has a systemic form and a cutaneous form which does not involve internal organs and is just characterized by skin lesions.

=== Systemic coagulopathy ===
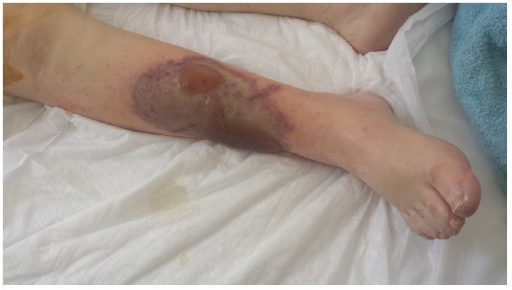
Right leg affected by warfarin-induced necrosis

This is when there is a severe, widespread disruption of blood clotting mechanisms in the body, and can be a result of:

- Compromised production of anti-clotting proteins C and S
- Warfarin-induced skin necrosis
- Disseminated intravascular coagulation which is a widespread excess of blood clotting leading to blocked blood flow and multiple organ dysfunction.
- Antiphospholipid antibody syndrome which is characterized by recurring formation of blood clots and adverse pregnancy outcomes.

=== Platelet plugging ===
Platelets are an important component in blood clotting, as they adhere to damaged blood vessel surfaces to form a plug to seal off injuries, so dysfunction in platelet activity can be a cause for excessive clotting.

- Heparin-induced necrosis: when heparin-platelet-antibody complexes may rarely trigger excess blood clotting and skin necrosis
- Thrombocytosis (abnormal high platelet count in blood) as a result of myeloproliferative disorders
- Thrombotic thrombocytopenic purpura resulting from a severe deficiency in an anti-clotting factor of the body (specific von Willebrand factor-cleaving protease ADAMTS13).

=== Cold-related agglutination ===
Figure of antibodies causing agglutination in cold temperatures

Rarely, certain antibodies cause agglutination (clumping), in cold temperatures and cold-related agglutination may be cause blockages and lead to vasculopathic disorders, such as in:

- Cryofibrinogenemia
- Cryoglobulinemia

=== Embolization ===
Besides blood clots, other foreign bodies called emboli can cause blockages in vessels, such as:

- Intravascular lymphoma, which is a rare form of non-Hodgkins lymphoma where cancer cells grow within the blood vessel walls.
- Cholesterol (e.g. artherosclerotic plaques)
- Excess oxalate levels in blood can lead to calcium oxalate deposits in the blood vessels (such as in calciphylaxis) blocking blood flow and causing vasculopathy.

=== Others ===
Other causes for occlusive vasculopathy not covered by the previous categories, such as:

- Cocaine-Levamisole toxicity — Levamisole-laced cocaine use has been associated with vasculopathic symptoms such as necrosis and retiform purpura.

== Signs and symptoms ==
While each subtype of occlusive vasculopathy has its own set of symptoms, it is mainly characterized by retiform purpura, which are branching patches of purplish discoloration caused by bleeding into the skin due to cell death caused by blockage of the blood vessels and oxygen supply. Other common symptoms include skin lesions, nodules, ulcerations, cell death (necrosis), and livedo racemosa, which is a net-like pattern of purplish discoloration with patchy, broken rings due to blockage of blood vessels but without resulting cell death like in purpura.

== Mechanism ==
Occlusive vasculopathy often starts with excessive blood coagulation ability, which increases the risk of forming a blood clot (thrombus) that blocks the blood vessel. Blockage can also be caused by other obstruction (embolus), such as detached blood clots from other sites of the body, cholesterol plaques, malignant cells, oxalate crystals, etc.

The development of occlusive vasculopathy can be divided into 4 stages.

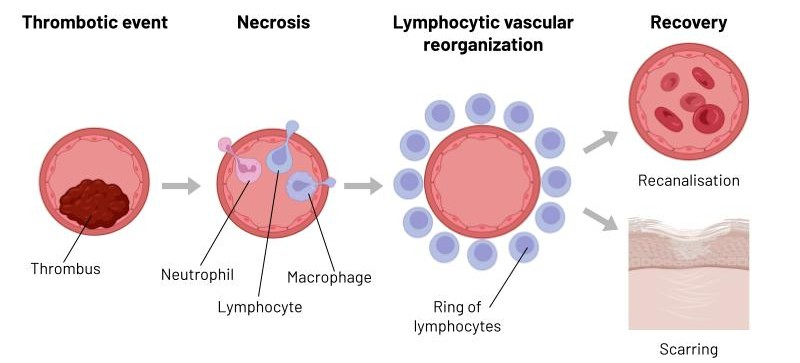
Diagram depicting the development of occlusive vasculopathy.

=== Thrombotic event ===
In the early stage, a blood clot begins forming inside the blood vessel, starting from a fibrin thrombus. The blockage induces leakage of blood vessels (hemorrhage), and shortage of oxygen and nutrients to tissues (ischemia). At this stage, the disorder presents as retiform purpura, the net-like purple patches on the skin, typical of occlusive vasculopathy.

=== Necrosis ===
Disease progression is marked by patches of dying tissue from prolonged starvation of oxygen and nutrients, forming extremely painful necrotic lesions. During this stage, immune cells like neutrophils, lymphocytes, and macrophages enter the wound site.

=== Lymphocytic vascular reorganization ===
As the blood clot breaks down, a subtype of immune cell called lymphocytes forms a ring surrounding the obstructed blood vessel. Alternative names for this phase include "secondary vasculitis", or "secondary inflammatory response".

=== Recovery ===
At last, the blood vessel is rebuilt into a functional blood vessel by recanalisation. If the damage is irreversible, fibroblasts travel to the wound site and deposit collagen, healing as white scars named atrophie blanche.

== Diagnosis ==
Diagnosis typically begins with a clinical assessment, followed by laboratory tests and skin biopsy to confirm.

=== Laboratory tests ===
Initial diagnosis includes blood tests that support the diagnosis of occlusive vasculopathy.

- Complete blood count generally shows normal parameters of red blood cells, white blood cells, platelets, and inflammatory markers. This aligns with the non-inflammatory nature of occlusive vasculopathy.
- Partial thromboplastin time (PTT) using lupus anticoagulants often requires more time for the blood to clot. Though this result is often related to bleeding risk, when using lupus anticoagulant, it counterintuitively signifies increased risk of thrombosis instead.
- Anti-neutrophil cytoplasmic antibodies (ANCAs) are typically absent, ruling out inflammation-triggered vasculitis.

=== Tissue biopsy ===
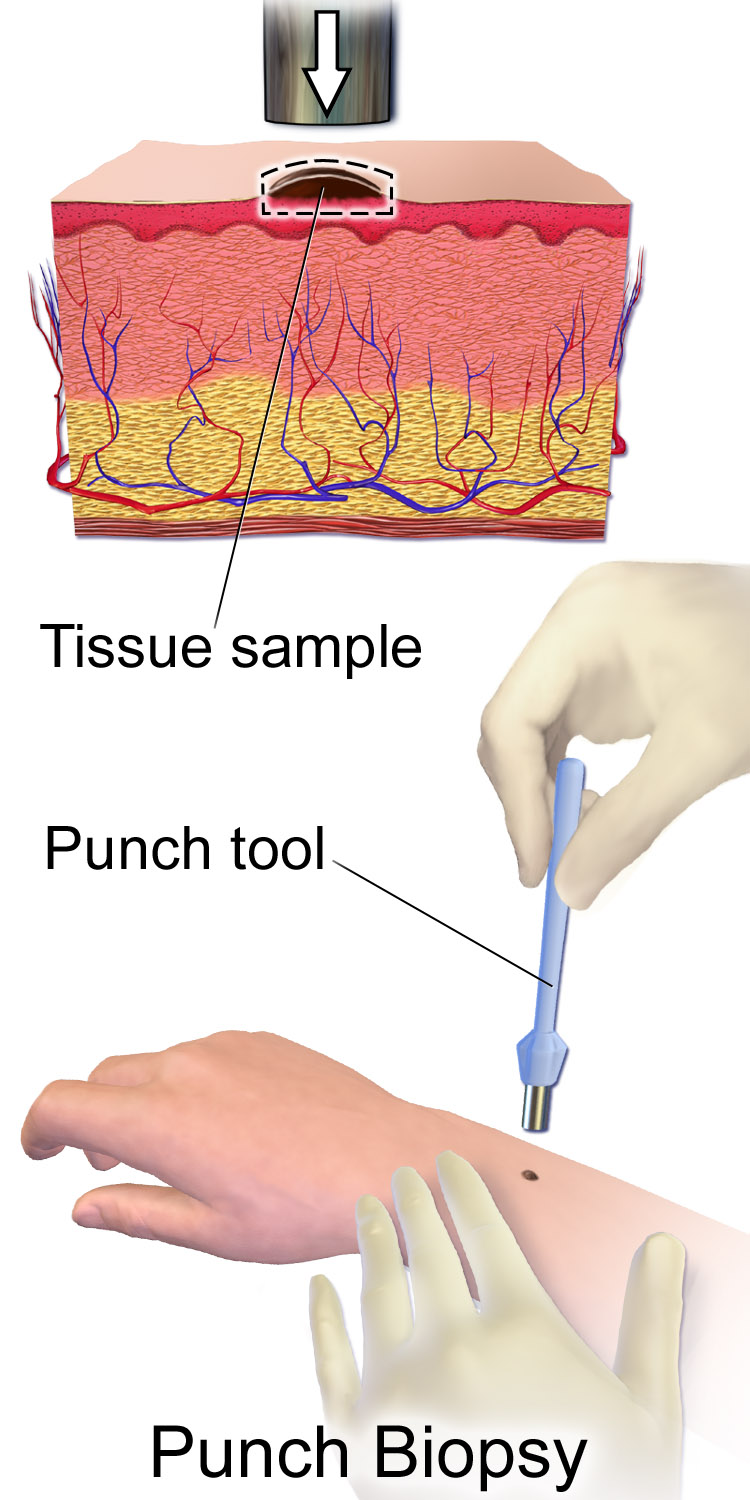
Diagram showing procedures of a skin punch biopsy.

Since blood tests alone are insufficient to confirm the diagnosis, a skin biopsy often follows. A small skin sample is taken from the wound's border, at the junction between healthy skin and the lesion.

Typical observations include:

- Visible blockage within the affected blood vessel, such as a blood clot
- Red blood cells that leaked out of the damaged blood vessel from hemorrhage
- A ring of lymphocytes surrounding the blood vessel

With the help of immunohistochemistry techniques, the tissue sample can sometimes reveal subtypes of occlusive vasculopathy. For example:

- Heparin necrosis, indicated by blood clots formed at the same site of heparin injection
- Myeloproliferative disorders, indicated by blockages that are CD61-positive
- Protein C and protein S deficiencies, indicated by occluded blood vessels with red blood cells leaked deep into the dermis
- Antiphospholipid syndrome (indicated by blood clot located at the dermo-hypodermal junction)
- Livedoid vasculopathy, indicated by smooth, pink-staining blood vessels showing hyalinisation, blood clots uniform in composition, and a ring of fibrin deposits surrounding the affected blood vessel
- Cholesterol embolism, indicated by needle-shaped gaps within the obstruction, which is a typical sign of cholesterol blockage
- Oxalate embolism, indicated by oxalate crystals in the blood vessel
- Metastatic carcinoma, indicated by lumen blocked with cancerous epithelial cells
- Intravascular lymphoma, indicated by lumen blocked with cancerous lymphocytes, more often in small blood vessels

== Treatment ==
A staircase model is used in treating occlusive vasculopathy, working up from addressing immediate symptoms to resolving the root cause through a stepped-care treatment plan.

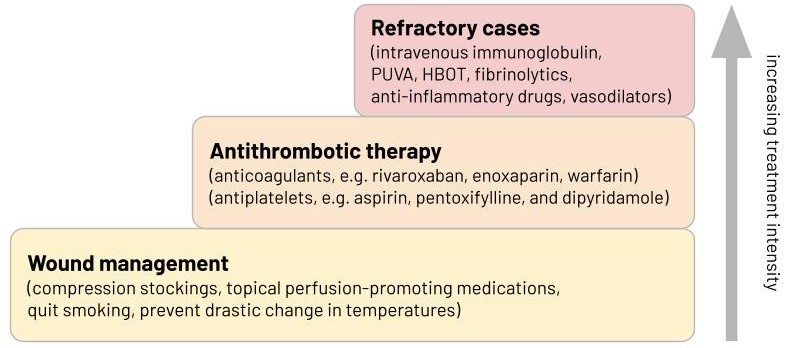
Treatment for occlusive vasculopathy, administered in a staircase model.

=== Wound management ===
Treatment starts with basic measures to manage ulcers, decrease pain, and improve blood circulation. For example, compression stockings to encourage blood or tissue fluids to return to the heart (addressing venous insufficiency and edema), and topical perfusion-promoting medications to be applied on the wound (addressing lack of blood flow). Removing risk factors that set back the wound healing process, such as smoking or drastic changes in temperature, is used in some cases.

=== Antithrombotic therapy ===
Many cases of occlusive vasculopathy are caused by blood clots. Hence, antithrombotic agents are commonly administered to remove the blockage. Anticoagulants target proteins in the blood coagulation cascade to slow blood clotting (e.g. rivaroxaban, enoxaparin, or warfarin). While antiplatelets prevent platelet cells from clumping to form blood clots (e.g. aspirin, pentoxifylline, or dipyridamole).

=== Addressing refractory cases ===
If therapies fail to control progression of the disease, additional treatments are administered to accelerate wound healing. This includes psoralen and UV-A photochemotherapy that reduces the size of lesion, hyperbaric oxygen therapy to help oxygen reach the wound site, and anti-inflammatory drugs (e.g. colchicine, dapsone, or hydroxychloroquine). Medication that restores circulation are also used. Including fibrinolytics to break down the thrombi (e.g. tPA), and vasodilators to facilitate the primary antithrombotic therapies (e.g. nifedipine).

Currently, a few emerging therapies are aimed at rectifying the damage. For example intravenous immunoglobulin therapy, JAK inhibitors (e.g. baricitinib), and TNF inhibitors (e.g. etanercept). Yet, these drugs are not adapted as the standard treatment, as its effects are only proven by initial results from pilot studies.

=== Addressing non-thrombotic embolus ===
When the obstruction is formed by substances other than blood clots, a different set of treatment method is applied:

Cholesterol embolism is commonly treated in three stages. First by stabilising the cholesterol blockage with low-molecular-weight heparin, then administering iloprost to widen the blood vessels, and finally alleviating the lymphocyte responses using corticosteroids or colchicine.

Heparin necrosis is generally resolved by discontinuing heparin treatment, and replacing it with other anticoagulation agents (e.g. argatroban, danaparoid, bivalirudin, or fondaparinux).

Microorganism-associated embolism is treated with antimicrobial therapies tailored specific to the infection.

== History ==
Historically, occlusive vasculopathy (with a non-inflammatory cause) is often confused with vasculitis (caused by blood vessels actively attacked by inflammatory cells). The two diseases can present with similar symptoms in the initial clinical assessment. Therefore, affected individuals were often misdiagnosed with vasculitis and treated with high-dose corticosteroids or immunosuppressive agents, which brings impactful side effects. In addition, older literature may mix up the mechanism, prognosis, and therapy between the two disorders, leading to conflicting recommendations.

Though the difference between occlusive vasculopathy and vasculitis is repeatedly emphasised, these two disorders can occur at the same time. Vasculitis can trigger blood-vessel-blocking events (e.g. in septic vasculitis), and vice versa, occluding vasculopathies may mimic vasculitis (e.g. in lymphocytic vascular reorganization).

== See also ==
- Vasculitis
- Vascular disease
