= Livedo =

Purplish skin discoloration

- Specialty: Dermatology

Livedo refers to a form of skin discoloration.

- Livedo reticularis
- Livedo racemosa
- Livedoid dermatitis
- Livedoid vasculitis
