= Cutaneous manifestations of COVID-19 =

Cutaneous manifestations related to coronavirus disease 2019

Cutaneous manifestations of COVID-19 are characteristic signs or symptoms of the Coronavirus disease 2019 that occur in the skin. The American Academy of Dermatology reports that skin lesions such as morbilliform (measles-like rashes, 22%), pernio (capillary damage, 18%), urticaria (hives, 16%), macular erythema (rose-colored rash, 13%), vesicular purpura (purplish discolouration, 11%), papulosquamous purpura (discolouration with scale. 9.9%) and retiform purpura (blood vessel obstruction and downstream ischaemia, 6.4%) are seen in people with COVID-19. Pernio-like lesions were more common in mild disease while retiform purpura was seen only in critically ill patients. The major dermatologic patterns identified in individuals with COVID-19 are urticarial rash, confluent erythematous/morbilliform rash, papulovesicular exanthem, chilbain-like acral pattern, livedo reticularis and purpuric "vasculitic" pattern. Chilblains and Multisystem inflammatory syndrome in children are also cutaneous manifestations of COVID-19.

Hyperactive immune responses in COVID-19 patients can contribute to the induction "cytokine storm" (in particular, IL-6); these cytokines could enter the skin and trigger dermal dendritic cells, lymphocytes, macrophages, mast cells, and neutrophils, and can assist in the development of lesions such as maculopapular rash. This representation of cutaneous lesion has been described earlier in diseases having an overactive immune response and excessive cytokine release (example, systemic lupus erythematosus, adult Still's disease, and antiphospholipid syndrome).

== Urticarial rash ==
Urticarial rash (hives) is seen in several bacterial and viral infections, so COVID-19 is no exception. These rashes are more commonly found in the trunk and limbs, relatively sparing the acral sites. Systemic corticosteroids are a therapeutic option for urticarial rash induced by COVID-19.

== Confluent erythematous rash ==
The erythematous rashes (redness caused by increased blood flow through skin capillaries) seen in COVID-19 are mostly present on the trunk and limbs, and associated with itching. Exanthems induced by viruses other than COVID-19 and drug reactions should be considered as differential diagnosis in the case of erythematous rashes.

== Livedo reticularis ==
Livedo reticularis refers to slowing of blood flow, leading to desaturation of blood and bluish discolouration of the skin. This type of skin rashes may be seen in cold-induced vasoconstriction as seen in polycythemia or other causes leading up to focal impairment of blood flow.

== Histopathological hallmarks ==
From the histological (microscopic anatomy) perspective, several features of the maculopapular lesion have been recognized. Maculopapular lesions exhibit superficial perivascular dermatitis with lymphocytic infiltrate and dilated vessels in the papillary and mid dermis with neutrophils, eosinophils, and nuclear debris. Epidermis revealed dispersed foci of hydropic changes, accompanied by minimum acanthosis, subcorneal pustules, slight spongiosis, Basal cell vacuolation, and foci of parakeratosis. A lichenoid pattern with eosinophils' presence on biopsy of skin lesions has been observed in some patients.
