= Microvascular occlusion =

- Specialty: Dermatology

Microvascular occlusion refers to conditions that can present with retiform purpura. It has been suggested that phenylephrine may be a cause.

== Signs and symptoms ==
Microvascular occlusions appears as bland necrosis without inflammation and retiform purpura.

== Causes ==
Microvascular occlusions can be caused by heparin-induced thrombocytopenia, cryoglobulinemia, angioinvasive organisms, embolization, disseminated intravascular coagulation, livedoid vasculopathy, cell occlusion syndromes, and iatrogenic causes.

== Outlook ==
The outcomes of microvascular occlusions are usually influenced by the degree, length, nature of the underlying cause, and prompt and effective treatment.
