= John Sinnott =

John Sinnott may refer to:

- John Sinnott (VC) (1829–1896), Irish recipient of the Victoria Cross
- John Sinnott (American football) (born 1958)
- John Sinnott (politician) (1905–1960), Canadian MP
- John Sinnott SJ (active 1948), rector of Beaumont College, Berkshire, England
- John T. Sinnott (born 1948), American physician, scientist, and business executive

== See also ==
- John Sinnott Elementary School, Milpitas, California
- John Synnott (1895-?), Irish Gaelic footballer
