= AERD (disambiguation) =

AERD may refer to:

- Aspirin-exacerbated respiratory disease, also known aspirin-induced asthma
- Atheroembolic renal disease, a cholesterol embolism involving the kidneys
- Atomic Energy Research Department, former name for Atomics International
