= Convex graph =

In mathematics, a convex graph may be

- a convex bipartite graph
- a convex plane graph
- the graph of a convex function
