= Biconvex =

Biconvex may refer to:

- Biconvex bipartite graph
- Biconvex lens
- Biconvex optimization
