= Perinatal gangrene of the buttock =

- Specialty: Dermatology

Perinatal gangrene of the buttock is a skin condition similar to livedoid dermatitis, and is usually a complication of umbilical artery catheterization, exchange transfusion, or cord injections by means of a syringe.

== See also ==
- List of cutaneous conditions
