= Sneddon's syndrome =

Sneddon syndrome
- Other names: Ehrmann-Sneddon syndrome, Livedo racemosa-cerebrovascular accident syndrome, Livedo reticularis-cerebrovascular accident syndrome, Sneddon-Champion syndrome, Livedo reticularis racemosa
- This condition may be inherited in an autosomal dominant manner, but is more often sporadic
- Specialty: Rheumatology

Sneddon's syndrome is a form of arteriopathy characterized by several symptoms, including:

- Severe, transient neurological symptoms or stroke
- Livedo reticularis, or livedo racemosa

== Signs and symptoms ==
Sneddon's syndrome generally manifests with stroke or severe, transient neurological symptoms, and a skin rash (livedo reticularis). Livedo reticularis appears as a bluish-purple, netlike mottling of the skin. Sneddon's syndrome may instead present with livedo racemosa, which involves larger, less organized patches of bluish-purple mottling of the skin. Both are generally found first in the extremities, both worsen in cold and either may occur without Sneddon's syndrome or any other systemic disease.

Sneddon's syndrome can be characterized by: transient amnesia, transient aphasia, palsy, headaches, hypertension, transient ischemic attacks (TIA), stroke, coronary disease and dementia. The skin manifestations may precede the neurologic symptoms by years.

== Pathogenesis ==
Sneddon's syndrome is a progressive, noninflammatory arteriopathy leading to the characteristic skin condition and to cerebrovascular problems, including stroke, transient ischemic attack (TIA), severe but transient neurological symptoms thought to be caused by cerebral vasospasm, coronary disease and early-onset dementia. Progressive compromise of arterial linings in Sneddon's produces clotting, for which high-dose warfarin is most commonly prescribed, and can also cause the development of systemic arterial plaque when cholesterol levels are normal.

== Diagnosis ==
There are no diagnostic tests on which all Sneddon's patients will have abnormal results, although brain MRI and skin biopsy are often abnormal. The diagnosis is based on a detailed history and physical examination. About 40-60% of patients with the syndrome test positive for antiphospholipid antibodies.

== Treatment ==
Sneddon's patients are generally treated with warfarin, maintaining a high INR of 3–4. Because most will experience significant relief of symptoms after several months of consistent INR in this range, treatment with warfarin is often used as a diagnostic tool.

== Epidemiology ==
Sneddon's syndrome is a rare condition that is usually misdiagnosed. It occurs in families and may be inherited in an autosomal dominant fashion. Sneddon's syndrome most often becomes apparent in women in their thirties, though cases do occur in men and in children. Generally, Livedo precedes cerebrovascular involvement by roughly ten years, and many years of cerebrovascular involvement precede the development of dementia, when it occurs.

== History ==
It is named for Ian Bruce Sneddon. In 1965, Dr. Sneddon first reported 6 patients with a distinct skin rash and cerebrovascular accidents (strokes).Sneddon's Syndrome was formerly understood to be a type of autoimmune disease called antiphospholipid syndrome, although it has been reclassified as a noninflammatory cerebrovascular disease. It should be considered in patients diagnosed with vasculitis when standard treatments fail.

== See also ==
- Livedoid vasculopathy
- List of cutaneous conditions
