= Livedo reticularis =

Purplish discoloration of the skin due to reduced blood flow

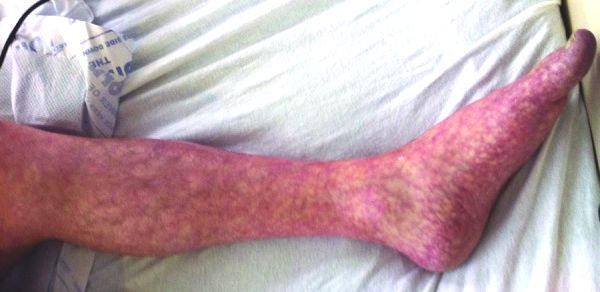
- Livedo reticularis secondary to obscure severe infrarenal aortoiliac stenosis with severe transient lactic acidosis.
- Specialty: Dermatology, cardiology
- Symptoms: Purpura, mottling of the skin, blood clots, skin discoloration
- Causes: Autoimmune diseases, hyperlipidemia, poisons, drug abuse

Livedo reticularis is a common skin finding consisting of a mottled reticulated vascular pattern that appears as a lace-like purplish discoloration of the skin. The discoloration is caused by reduction in blood flow (ischemia) through the arterioles that supply the cutaneous capillaries, resulting in deoxygenated blood showing as blue discoloration (cyanosis). This can be a secondary effect of a condition that increases a person's risk of forming blood clots (thrombosis), including a wide array of pathological and nonpathological conditions. Examples include hyperlipidemia, microvascular hematological or anemia states, nutritional deficiencies, hyper- and autoimmune diseases, and drugs/toxins.

The condition may be normal or related to more severe underlying pathology. Its differential diagnosis is broadly divided into possible blood diseases, autoimmune (rheumatologic), cardiovascular diseases, cancers, and endocrine disorders. It can usually (in 80% of cases) be diagnosed by biopsy.

It may be aggravated by exposure to cold, and occurs most often in the lower extremities.

The condition's name derives from Latin livere 'bluish' and reticular 'net-like pattern'.

== Causes ==
A number of conditions may cause the appearance of livedo reticularis:

- Cutis marmorata telangiectatica congenita, a rare congenital condition
- Sneddon syndrome – association of livedoid vasculitis and systemic vascular disorders, such as strokes, due to underlying genetic cause
- Idiopathic livedo reticularis – the most common form of livedo reticularis, completely benign condition of unknown cause affecting mostly young women during the winter: It is a lacy purple appearance of skin in extremities due to sluggish venous blood flow. It may be mild, but ulceration may occur later in the summer.
- Secondary livedo reticularis:
  - Vasculitis autoimmune conditions:
    - Livedoid vasculitis – with painful ulceration occurring in the lower legs
    - Polyarteritis nodosa
    - Systemic lupus erythematosus
    - Dermatomyositis
    - Rheumatoid arthritis
    - Lymphoma
    - Pancreatitis
    - Chronic pancreatitis
    - Tuberculosis
  - Drug-related:
    - Adderall (side effect)
    - Amantadine (side effect)
    - Bromocriptine (side effect)
    - Beta interferon treatment, e.g. in multiple sclerosis
    - Livedo reticularis associated with rasagiline
    - Methylphenidate and dextroamphetamine-induced peripheral vasculopathy
    - Gefitinib
  - Obstruction of capillaries:
    - Cryoglobulinaemia – proteins in the blood that clump together in cold conditions
    - Antiphospholipid syndrome due to small blood clots
    - Hypercalcaemia (raised blood calcium levels which may be deposited in the capillaries)
    - Haematological disorders of polycythaemia rubra vera or thrombocytosis (excessive red cells or platelets)
    - Infections (infective endocarditis, syphilis, tuberculosis, Lyme disease)
    - Associated with acute kidney injury due to cholesterol emboli status after cardiac catheterization
    - Arteriosclerosis (cholesterol emboli) and homocystinuria (due to Chromosome 21 autosomal recessive Cystathionine beta synthase deficiency)
    - Intra-arterial injection (especially in drug addicts)
  - Ehlers-Danlos syndrome – connective tissue disorder, often with many secondary conditions, may be present in all types
  - Pheochromocytoma
  - Livedoid vasculopathy and its association with factor V Leiden mutation
  - FILS syndrome (polymerase ε1 mutation in a human syndrome with facial dysmorphism, immunodeficiency, livedo, and short stature)
  - Primary hyperoxaluria, oxalosis (oxalate vasculopathy)
  - Cytomegalovirus infection (very rare clinical form, presenting with persistent fever and livedo reticularis on the extremities and cutaneous necrotizing vasculitis of the toes)
  - Generalized livedo reticularis induced by silicone implants for soft tissue augmentation
  - As a rare skin finding in children with Down syndrome
  - Idiopathic livedo reticularis with polyclonal IgM hypergammopathy
  - CO_{2} angiography (rare, reported case)
  - A less common skin lesion of eosinophilic granulomatosis with polyangiitis
  - Erythema nodosum-like cutaneous lesions of sarcoidosis showing livedoid changes in a patient with sarcoidosis and Sjögren's syndrome
  - Livedo vasculopathy associated with IgM antiphosphatidylserine-prothrombin complex antibody
  - Livedo vasculopathy associated with plasminogen activator inhibitor-1 promoter homozygosity and prothrombin G20210A heterozygosity
  - As a first sign of metastatic breast carcinoma (very rare)
  - Livedo reticularis associated with renal cell carcinoma (rare)
  - Buerger's disease (as an initial symptom)
  - As a rare manifestation of Graves hyperthyroidism
  - Associated with pernicious anaemia
  - Moyamoya disease (a rare, chronic cerebrovascular occlusive disease of unknown cause, characterized by progressive stenosis of the arteries of the circle of Willis leading to an abnormal capillary network and resultant ischemic strokes or cerebral hemorrhages)
  - Associated with the use of a midline catheter (atheroempolic renal DX) due to angioplasty
  - Familial primary cryofibrinogenemia.

== Diagnosis ==
Livedo reticularis is diagnosed by its clinical appearance and history. No further test or examination confirms idiopathic livedo reticularis. However, further investigations may be undertaken where an underlying cause is suspected such as skin biopsies, or blood tests for antibodies associated with antiphospholipid syndrome or systemic lupus erythematosus.

== Treatment ==
Other than identifying and treating any underlying conditions in secondary livedo, idiopathic livedo reticularis may improve with warming the area.

== See also ==
- Livedoid dermatitis
- Livedo racemosa
- Perinatal gangrene of the buttock
- erythema ab igne (AKA livedo recticularis e calore) - a rash caused by prolonged heat exposure (e.g. hot water bottle or heat pad)
- List of cutaneous conditions
