= Levamisole-induced necrosis syndrome =

Complication of adulterated cocaine use

Levamisole-induced necrosis syndrome (LINES) is a complication characterized by necrosis resulting from exposure to levamisole, a medication with immunomodulatory properties. While LINES can occur with levamisole use alone, most reported cases are associated with the use of cocaine adulterated with levamisole as a cutting agent. This syndrome is marked by skin necrosis, often affecting areas such as the ears, face, and extremities, and is thought to result from levamisole's effects on blood vessels and the immune system.

== Mechanism of action ==
Levamisole, commonly found in cocaine, enhances cocaine's effects in vivo, creating a stronger, synergistic impact. In the body, levamisole is converted into aminorex, a toxic substance with amphetamine-like stimulant effects and a long duration of action. Cocaine acts as a serotonin–norepinephrine–dopamine reuptake inhibitor (SNDRI), while aminorex is a serotonin–norepinephrine–dopamine releasing agent (SNDRA), which is similar in that it increases the levels of these neurotransmitters but does so by promoting their release rather than inhibiting their reuptake.

Levamisole is on the World Health Organization's List of Essential Medicines as an intestinal anthelmintic, a class of antiparasitic drugs. After a typical prescribed dose of levamisole, only a small fraction is converted to aminorex, with maximum aminorex concentrations in urine being relatively low. In these controlled, therapeutic contexts, the amount of aminorex formed is much lower than doses historically associated with aminorex toxicity or abuse, or than the cumulative exposure seen with chronic use of levamisole-adulterated cocaine in individuals with cocaine dependence.

== Treatment ==
Methylprednisolone was started and wound care was initiated. Epidermal necrosis then evolved to myonecrosis extending from midthigh to the foot which necessitated below-knee amputation of the right leg. The patient also required allografts to his chest and abdomen and autografts to his face and left leg.

== History ==
Levamisole, a derivative of imidazothiazole, was previously approved as an antihelminthic and immunomodulator. It experienced some usage for the treatment of rheumatoid arthritis but was primarily used for the treatment of parasitic infections. It was withdrawn from the U.S. market in early 2000 because of adverse health events. However, it is still approved in the United States as an antihelminthic agent in veterinary medicine.

In 2011 a team of physicians from University of South Florida Morsani College of Medicine in Tampa, FL (under the attending service of John T. Sinnott, MD FACP) recognized an association of skin necrosis with use of levamisole adulterated cocaine. The mnemonic LINES (Levamisole-Induced NEcrosis Syndrome) was coined to name the syndrome because the name was descriptive, reminds one of a "line" of cocaine, and is easily remembered. Thus it is self-exemplifying.

=== Initial case report ===
LINES was first described in a 54-year-old male with history of hypothyroidism who presented to an urgent care facility with bilateral axillary adenopathy and severe malaise. Incision and drainage of the nodes was performed and he was discharged home with sulfamethoxazole/trimethoprim for presumed methicillin-resistant Staphylococcus aureus (MRSA) infection.

The patient subsequently developed a temperature of 37.5 °C, expressed rigors, and night sweats. He returned to the ED the next day and on further history admitted to 3 weeks of "snorting 6–8 lines of coke a day" and smoking marijuana every evening to "come down". He was hospitalized and treated with cefepime, doxycycline, and fluconazole empirically. The next day erythematous painful papules appeared on his trunk, arms, face, and ears. Blood cultures were negative. There was prominent necrosis of the cheek region, nose, and lips with complete sparing of the back. Skin biopsy revealed extensive small vessel thrombosis throughout the superficial and deep dermal plexuses with perivascular mononuclear inflammatory infiltrate and a few neutrophils surrounding the vessels. Erythrocyte sedimentation rate was elevated at 35 mm/hour; cardiolipin IgM was weakly positive at 16.3; C4 was decreased at 10 mg/dl; antinuclear antibodies were negative and p-ANCA was reactive. Coagulation studies were within normal limits. There was an elevated d-dimer of 17.54 mg/mL and platelets were slightly decreased. The patient's urine drug screen was positive for cannabis but not cocaine.

== Related ==
=== Cocaine/levamisole-associated syndromes ===
The skin necrosis associated with levamisole toxicity ranges from leukocytoclastic vasculitis to occlusive vasculopathy. Several cases of severe agranulocytosis associated with cocaine use have been reported since 2006. With the recently recognized dermal disease, the face and ears are commonly affected, especially the bilateral helices and cheeks. However, there have also been case reports of involvement of the abdomen, chest, lower buttocks and legs.

During the mid-2010s, levamisole was found in most cocaine products available in both the United States and Europe. Levamisole is known to cause an acute condition involving a severe and dangerous lowered white blood cell count, known as agranulocytosis, in cocaine users, and may also accentuate cocaine's effects.

==== Cocaine- and levamisole-induced vasculitis ====
Cocaine- and levamisole-induced vasculitis (CLIV) is often used as an umbrella term for the vasculitic and necrotic complications seen with levamisole-adulterated cocaine, including both LINES and CLAAS.

Cocaine and levamisole-adulterated cocaine (LAC) can cause cocaine-induced vasculitis (CIV) that mimics primary anti-neutrophil cytoplasmic antibody (ANCA)-associated vasculitis (AAV), presenting as cocaine-induced midline destructive lesions, LAC vasculopathy, or CIV. These conditions involve immune activation through NETosis and ANCA formation, leading to tissue damage. Diagnosis is challenging due to symptom overlap and undisclosed drug use, making clinical suspicion and drug history essential for proper management.

===== Cocaine/levamisole-associated autoimmune syndrome =====
The broader cocaine/levamisole-associated autoimmune syndrome (CLAAS) includes LINES as a subset and is also common, but LINES is more specifically and frequently cited in the context of street cocaine adulteration.

Levamisole has become a common additive to illicit cocaine. It is thought to intensify the "high" by releasing dopamine in the brain, acts as a bulking agent, and is a difficult adulterant to recognize. Potential risks of levamisole-laced cocaine include autoimmune disease, neutropenia, arthralgias, retiform purpura, skin necrosis, and fever.
