= Heparin necrosis =

- Specialty: Dermatology
- Causes: Heparin

Heparin necrosis (also known as heparin-induced skin necrosis) is an adverse reaction that can occur on skin after initiation of heparin treatment. The condition generally occurs 5 to 11 days after treatment with heparin and can occur either at heparin injection sites or at distant locations in the body. Initial presentation is characterized by painful erythematous skin lesions that can develop into hemorrhagic bullae, purpuric plaques and eventually cause skin necrosis. The lesions tend to occur at common injection sites like abdomen, thighs and buttocks but less commonly can present at distant locations such as the extremities. The condition often presents as a sequela of immune mediated heparin induced thrombocytopenia but can also be due to delayed-type hypersensitivity reactions, local microvascular thrombosis or underlying thrombophilia. Female patients are at an increased risk for heparin necrosis due to increased likelihood for hypersensitivity reactions and coagulopathy occurring during pregnancy. Additional risk factors include obesity, use of unfractionated heparin and previous exposure to heparin.

== Causes and pathophysiology ==
Heparin necrosis can occur through multiple different mechanisms. The most often cause is attributed to heparin induced thrombocytopenia or HIT. HIT is an immune mediated reaction where heparin and platelet factor 4 (PF4) form a complex with IgG auto antibodies. The IgG-Heparin/PF4 complex then binds onto platelets causing platelet activation and aggregation leading to a prothrombotic state of dermal vessels and subsequent ischemia and skin necrosis.

Another mechanism of tissue injury involves delayed-type (type IV) characterized by T- cell mediated inflammation. Presentation of skin injury can range from small eczematous plaques to generalized erythematous rashes that can further progress to necrosis if not treated.

Lastly heparin necrosis can also be precipitated by underlying thombophillia such as protein C or protein S deficiency by promoting a hypercoagulable state with increased risk of ischemia and necrosis in the dermal vasculature.

== Treatment ==
Once heparin has been identified as the culprit, it is important to immediately discontinue all forms of heparin treatment. Early withdrawal is imperative to prevent further ischemia and skin damage. Additionally, it is important to start an alternative anticoagulant given that the body is currently in a pro-thrombotic state. Common treatments include direct thrombin inhibitors such as argatroban or bivalirudin or factor Xa inhibitors such as fondaparinux. Furthermore, it is also important to discontinue warfarin in the acute phase as it can worsen prothrombotic state through depletion of protein C and S

== Risk factors ==
Heparin-induced necrosis has been associated with multiple risk factors. One risk factor is female sex, however exact cause of the association has not been established. Some theories include greater propensity for immune-mediated and hypersensitivity reactions and interactions with hormonal factors. Obesity has also been attributed as a risk factor due to increased drug accumulation in the adipose tissue at injection sites and resulting delayed drug metabolism. Another risk factor is the previous history of HIT and re-expsoure to heparin during cardiac/vascular surgeries. These patients are at greater risk of developing antibodies against heparin and therefore HIT and heparin necrosis.

Predisposing conditions such as underlying thrombophillia with protein C or protein S deficiencies can also increase the risk of heparin related skin injury as it exacerbates a pro-thrombotic state. Because protein C and S function as natural anticoagulants, prior depletion with a concurrent onset of thrombotic state as a sequelae of HIT could exponentiate tissue injury from heparin necrosis.

Therapy duration of greater than 9 days with heparin has also been identified as potential risk factor. Additionally the use of unfractionated heparin over low molecular weight heparin has also been shown to increase the risk for heparin related injury. Lastly, repeated injection at same injection site for prolonged periods of time or accumulation of drug within one region can increase the risk for heparin related skin injury.

== See also ==
- Warfarin necrosis
- List of cutaneous conditions
