= Cholesterol embolism =

- Other names: Cholesterol crystal embolism, atheroembolism, blue toe, purple toe syndrome, trash foot, warfarin blue toe syndrome
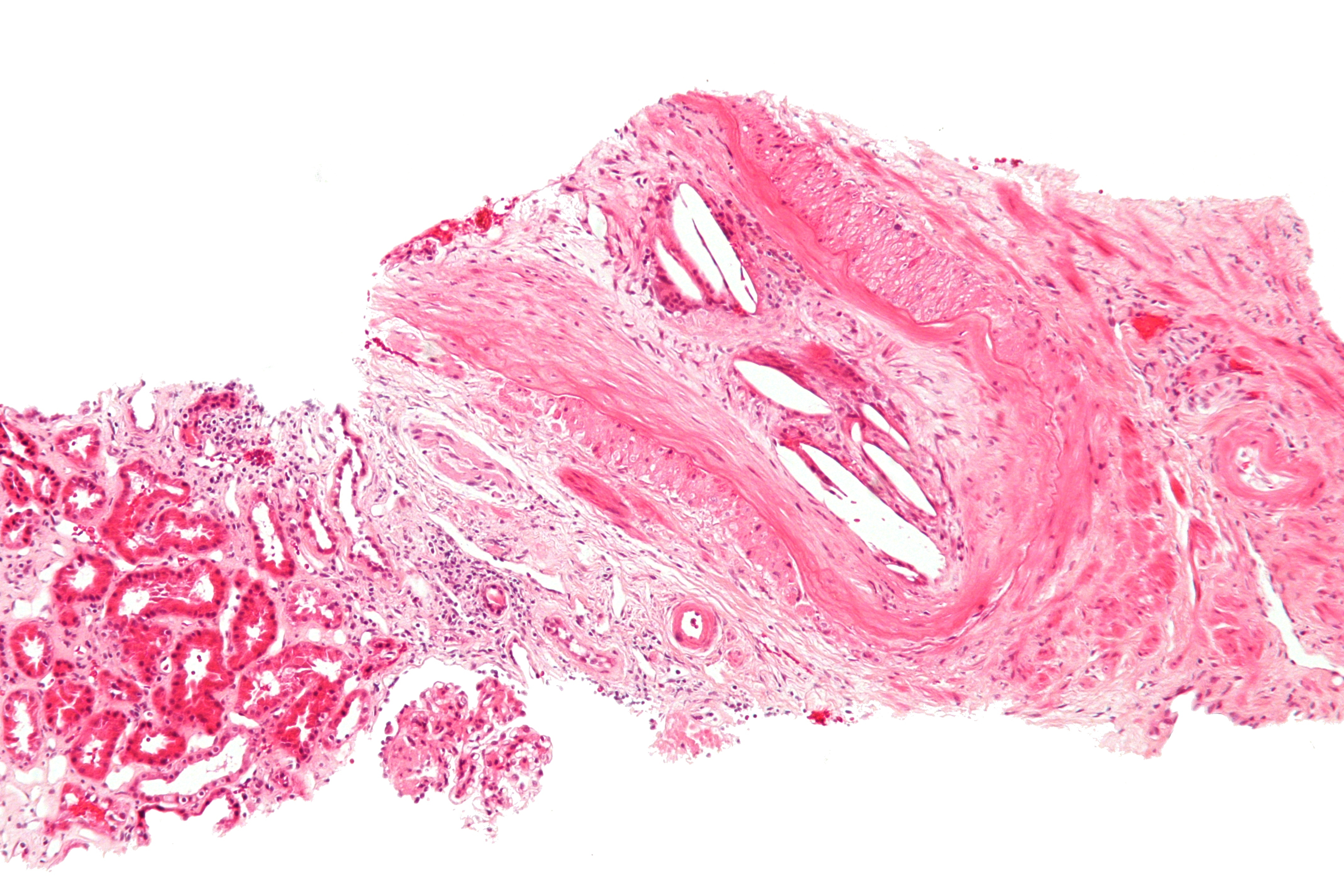
- Micrograph showing a cholesterol embolus in a medium sized artery of the kidney. Kidney biopsy. H&E stain.
- Specialty: Cardiology

Cholesterol embolism occurs when cholesterol is released, usually from an atherosclerotic plaque, and travels as an embolus in the bloodstream to lodge (as an embolism) causing an obstruction in blood vessels further away. Most commonly this causes skin symptoms (usually livedo reticularis), gangrene of the extremities and sometimes kidney failure; problems with other organs may arise, depending on the site at which the cholesterol crystals enter the bloodstream. When the kidneys are involved, the disease is referred to as atheroembolic renal disease. The diagnosis usually involves biopsy (removing a tissue sample) from an affected organ. Cholesterol embolism is treated by removing the cause and giving supportive therapy; statin drugs have been found to improve the prognosis.

== Signs and symptoms ==
The symptoms experienced in cholesterol embolism depend largely on the organ involved. Non-specific symptoms often described are fever, muscle ache and weight loss. Embolism to the legs causes a mottled appearance and purple discoloration of the toes, small infarcts and areas of gangrene due to tissue death that usually appear black, and areas of the skin that assume a marbled pattern known as livedo reticularis. The pain is usually severe and requires opiates. If the ulcerated plaque is below the renal arteries the manifestations appear in both lower extremities. Very rarely the ulcerated plaque is below the aortic bifurcation and those cases the changes occur only in one lower extremity.

Kidney involvement leads to the symptoms of kidney failure, which are non-specific but usually cause nausea, reduced appetite (anorexia), raised blood pressure (hypertension), and occasionally the various symptoms of electrolyte disturbance such as an irregular heartbeat. Some patients report hematuria (bloody urine) but this may only be detectable on microscopic examination of the urine. Increased amounts of protein in the urine may cause edema (swelling) of the skin (a combination of symptoms known as nephrotic syndrome).

If emboli have spread to the digestive tract, reduced appetite, nausea and vomiting may occur, as well as nonspecific abdominal pain, gastrointestinal hemorrhage (vomiting blood, or admixture of blood in the stool), and occasionally acute pancreatitis (inflammation of the pancreas).

Both the central nervous system (brain and spinal cord) and the peripheral nervous system may be involved. Emboli to the brain may cause stroke-like episodes, headache and episodes of loss of vision in one eye (known as amaurosis fugax). Emboli to the eye can be seen by ophthalmoscopy and are known as plaques of Hollenhorst. Emboli to the spinal cord may cause paraparesis (decreased power in the legs) or cauda equina syndrome, a group of symptoms due to loss of function of the distal part of the spinal cord – loss of control over the bladder, rectum and skin sensation around the anus. If the blood supply to a single nerve is interrupted by an embolus, the result is loss of function in the muscles supplied by that nerve; this phenomenon is called a mononeuropathy.

== Causes ==
It is relatively unusual (25% of the total number of cases) for cholesterol emboli to occur spontaneously; this usually happens in people with severe atherosclerosis of the large arteries such as the aorta. In the other 75% it is a complication of medical procedures involving the blood vessels, such as vascular surgery or angiography. In coronary catheterization, for instance, the incidence is 1.4%. Furthermore, cholesterol embolism may develop after the commencement of anticoagulants or thrombolytic medication that decrease blood clotting or dissolve blood clots, respectively. They probably lead to cholesterol emboli by removing blood clots that cover up a damaged atherosclerotic plaque; cholesterol-rich debris can then enter the bloodstream.

== Diagnosis ==
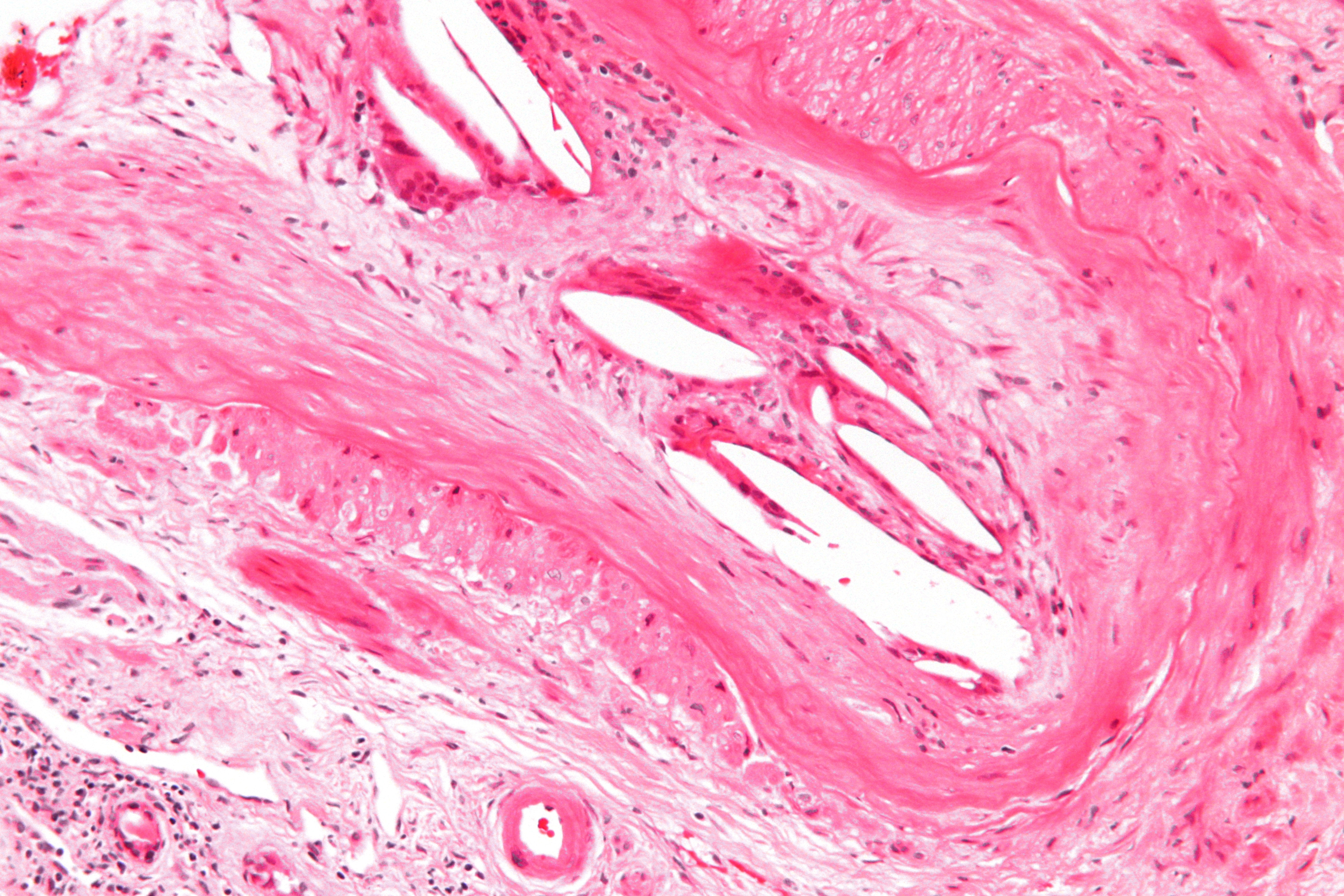
Micrograph of a cholesterol embolus showing the characteristic cholesterol clefts (biconvex white spaces) and a giant cell reaction. Kidney biopsy. H&E stain.

=== Differential diagnosis ===
Findings on general investigations (such as blood tests) are not specific for cholesterol embolism, which makes diagnosis difficult. The main problem is the distinction between cholesterol embolism and vasculitis (inflammation of the small blood vessels), which may cause very similar symptoms - especially the skin findings and the kidney dysfunction. Worsening kidney function after an angiogram may also be attributed to kidney damage by substances used during the procedure (contrast nephropathy). Other causes that may lead to similar symptoms include ischemic kidney failure (kidney dysfunction due to an interrupted blood supply), a group of diseases known as thrombotic microangiopathies and endocarditis (infection of the heart valves with small clumps of infected tissue embolizing through the body).

=== Blood and urine ===
Tests for inflammation (C-reactive protein and the erythrocyte sedimentation rate) are typically elevated, and abnormal liver enzymes may be seen. If the kidneys are involved, tests of kidney function (such as urea and creatinine) are elevated. The complete blood count may show particularly high numbers of a type of white blood cell known as eosinophils (more than 0.5 billion per liter); this occurs in only 60-80% of cases, so normal eosinophil counts do not rule out the diagnosis. Examination of the urine may show red blood cells (occasionally in casts as seen under the microscope) and increased levels of protein; in a third of the cases with kidney involvement, eosinophils can also be detected in the urine. If vasculitis is suspected, complement levels may be determined as reduced levels are often encountered in vasculitis; complement is a group of proteins that forms part of the innate immune system. Complement levels are frequently reduced in cholesterol embolism, limiting the use of this test in the distinction between vasculitis and cholesterol embolism.

=== Tissue diagnosis ===
The microscopic examination of tissue (histology) gives the definitive diagnosis. The diagnostic histopathologic finding is intravascular cholesterol crystals, which are seen as cholesterol clefts in routinely processed tissue (embedded in paraffin wax). The cholesterol crystals may be associated with macrophages, including giant cells, and eosinophils.

The sensitivity of small core biopsies is modest, due to sampling error, as the process is often patchy. Affected organs show the characteristic histologic changes in 50-75% of the clinically diagnosed cases. Non-specific tissue findings suggestive of a cholesterol embolization include ischemic changes, necrosis and unstable-appearing complex atherosclerotic plaques (that are cholesterol-laden and have a thin fibrous cap). While biopsy findings may not be diagnostic, they have significant value, as they help exclude alternate diagnoses, e.g. vasculitis, that often cannot be made confidently based on clinical criteria.

== Treatment ==
Treatment of an episode of cholesterol emboli is generally symptomatic, i.e. it deals with the symptoms and complications but cannot reverse the phenomenon itself. In kidney failure resulting from cholesterol crystal emboli, statins (medication that reduces cholesterol levels) have been shown to halve the risk of requiring hemodialysis.

== History ==
The phenomenon of embolisation of cholesterol was first recognized by the Danish pathologist Dr. Peter Ludvig Panum and published in 1862. Further evidence that eroded atheroma was the source of emboli came from American pathologist Dr. Curtis M. Flory, who in 1945 reported the phenomenon in 3.4% of a large autopsy series of older individuals with severe atherosclerosis of the aorta.
