= Multisystem inflammatory syndrome =

Name for multiple medical conditions

Multisystem inflammatory syndrome may refer to:

- Multisystem inflammatory syndrome in children (also known as 'paediatric multisystem inflammatory syndrome', or 'paediatric inflammatory multisystem syndrome' - 'PIMS'), a rare life-threatening illness resembling Kawasaki disease that has been observed following exposure to the virus responsible for COVID-19; while a similar syndrome has also been reported in adults.
- Kawasaki disease, a rare disease of unknown origin that affects young children, in which blood vessels become inflamed throughout the body.
- Systemic inflammatory response syndrome, inflammation affecting the whole body in response to an infectious or noninfectious insult.
- Neonatal-onset multisystem inflammatory disease, a rare genetic autoinflammatory disease which causes uncontrolled systemic inflammation from early infancy.

== See also ==
- Inflammation
- Multisystem disease
- Syndrome
