= John T. Sinnott =

American physician and academic

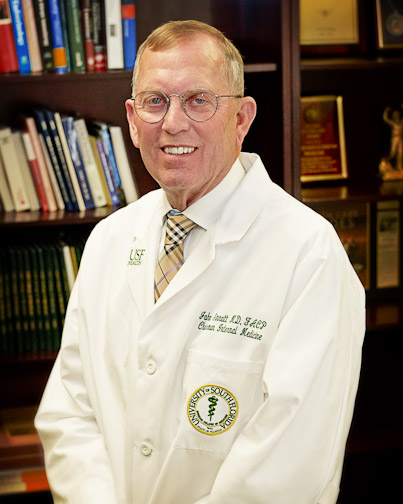
- Chair of Medicine University of South Florida
- Born: May 16, 1948 (age 78)
- Occupation: Physician

John T. Sinnott (born May 16, 1948) is a physician, scientist, and academic who is the chairman of internal medicine at the University of South Florida College of Medicine. Sinnott is also the James P. Cullison Professor of Medicine as well. Sinnott has served as the director of the Florida Infectious Disease Institute since 2004 and is the former associate dean of USF Medicine International, which he founded with Dr. Lynette Menezes.

Sinnott studied the importance of Levamisole-induced vasculitis.

In 2021, Sinnott was a research physician on the team that created a novel, patented 3D-printed swab for COVID-19 diagnosis. The team, led by Summer Decker PhD, successfully conducted a multi-site national clinical trial at Tampa General Hospital within a span of two weeks, a process that typically takes years, and produced swabs that cost approximately $0.25 each to produce. The swabs were donated to humanity for the first year of production. As of August 2022, over 100 million of these devices have been used in more than 60 countries. In 2022, this creation was recognized with the prestigious Patents for Humanity award from the U.S. Patent and Trademark Office. A video of the award ceremony may be watched here: https://uspto.cosocloud.com/pla5tp0bw9se/.

== Biography ==
Sinnott graduated from Columbus College in Georgia in 1971 and received a Master of Science degree from the University of South Florida in 1973 in microbiology. He was awarded an MD degree from University of South Alabama in 1978. Sinnott completed his postdoctoral training at the University of South Florida. He completed an internal medicine residency and infectious diseases and tropical medicine fellowship in 1983 at the University of South Florida under Dr. Charles Craig.

In 1983, Sinnott was named director of clinical research in the University of South Florida Infectious Diseases and Tropical Medicine Division. He served as an assistant professor in internal medicine at USF from 1983 to 1989 and was an adjunct professor at USF in the orthopedics department from 1984 to 1990. Sinnott was named the infectious disease coordinator at Tampa General Hospital and University of South Florida College of Medicine in 1985.

In 1991 Sinnott was named director of the Division of Infectious Disease and International Medicine at USF College of Medicine. In 2005, Sinnott was named Associate Dean of USF Medicine International and held that position until 2013. In 2013 he was selected Chairman of the Department of Internal Medicine at Morsani College of Medicine. While also serving as the Associate Dean of USF Medicine International, Sinnott also served as a Global Health Professor from 2005 to 2012. From 2005 to 2010, Sinnott also served as co-director of the Interdisciplinary Program in Allergy, Immunology, and Infectious Disease.

While director of the Infectious Disease Dr. Sinnott started the USF Florida Institute for Infectious Disease which helped the state spearhead a biodefense education program while building a nationally recognized infectious disease fellowship. In 2001 he was appointed as the Senior Advisor for Biodefense to Florida Secretary of Health Dr. John Agwunobi. In 2006, Sinnott served on Governor Charlie Crist's Transition Team, advising on health care.

In 2012 Sinnott was selected to be chairman of the Department of Internal Medicine at the Morsani College of Medicine at USF. In 2016 he helped arrange the Sister Cities Agreement between Tampa, FL and Lanzhou, China. Tampa mayor Bob Buckhorn and his Sister City representative traveled with Sinnott to Lanzhou, China, to sign this agreement, which is Tampa's first Sister City in Asia.

In 2003, Sinnott was elected as chairman of the board for Food Tech, VIFL (NASDAQ). He oversaw an expansion in business when he focused the company on medical device sterilization. He also oversaw the sale of the company to Sterigenics. Sinnott also served as a Trustee on the Board of the USF Foundation from 2008 to 2020 and the Florida Health Science Center (Tampa General Hospital) Board of Directors from 2008 to 2018.

Since 1985, Sinnott has served as the director of Epidemiology and Employee Health at Tampa General Hospital. He has served as the Epidemiologist for Shriner's Children Hospital since 1987.

In 2019, Renaissance Weekend, an invitation-only annual gathering of leaders and innovators from various fields, invited Sinnott to become a member. In 2020, Dr. Stephen Klasko at the World Economic Forum invited him to serve as a consultant.

== Publications ==
- Layton, J; Theiopoulou, DC; Rutenberg, D; Elshereye, A; Zhang, Y; Sinnott, J; Kim, K; Montoya, JG; Contopoulos-Ioannidis, DG (2023). "Clinical Spectrum, Radiological Findings, and Outcomes of Severe Toxoplasmosis in Immunocompetent Hosts: A Systematic Review". Pathogens. 12 (4): 543. doi:10.3390/pathogens12040543. PMC 10145896. PMID 37111429.
- Decker, SJ; Goldstein, TA; Ford, JM; Teng, MN; Pugliese, RS; Berry, GJ; Pettengill, M; Silbert, S; Hazelton, TR; Wilson, JW; Shine, K; Wang, ZX; Hutchinson, M; Castagnaro, J; Bloom, OE; Breining, DA; Goldsmith, BM; Sinnott, JT; O'Donnell, DG; Crawford, JM; Lockwood, CJ; Kim, K (2021). "3-Dimensional Printed Alternative to the Standard Synthetic Flocked Nasopharyngeal Swabs Used for Coronavirus Disease 2019 Testing". Clin Infect Dis. 73 (9): e3027–e3032. doi:10.1093/cid/ciaa1366. PMC 7499529. PMID 32910817.
- Shapshak P, Pandjassarame K, Fujimura RK, Commins D, Chiappelli F, Singer E, Levine A, Minagar A, Novembre F, Somboonwit C, Nath A, Sinnott JT. NeuroAIDS Review. Editorial. AIDS 2011; 25:123-141.
- Houseknecht K, Oliva AM, Sinnott JT (2008). "Contact lens-associated Fusarium keratitis: an eye for trouble". Asian Biomed. 2 (1): 35–42. Archived from the original on 2019-03-23.
- Billington, A; Sinnott, JT (2005). "[Book Review] The Great Influenza". Infections in Medicine. 22 (8): 375.
- Wills, Todd S.; Degryse, Amber; Lavina, Jenna; Sinnott, John T. (2004). "Blastoschizomyces capitatus Pneumonia in an Immunocompetent Male". Southern Medical Journal. 97 (7): 702–704. doi:10.1097/00007611-200407000-00019. PMID 15301131. S2CID 43137853.
- Gill, JK; Field, T; Vincent, AL; Greene, JN; Sandin, RL; Sinnott, JT (2003). "Antibiotic susceptibility among penicillin-resistant pneumococcal isolates in cancer patients". Infections in Medicine. 20: 9.
- Vincent, AL; Sinnott, JT (2003). "Apparent per capita consumption of cigarettes by Florida counties". Fl J of Public Health. 13: 1.
- Sinnott, JT; Degryse, A (2003). "Death and dying [Book Review]". JAMA. 289 (2): 235–236. doi:10.1001/jama.289.2.235.
- Ganguly R, Lenox B, Quiroz E, Sinnott JT. HIV infection, risk factors, and testing in a veteran population. Amer Clin Lab 2002 Mar; 21(2):32-9
- Montero, JA; Zaulyanov, LL; Houston, S. H; Sinnott, JT. Chancroid (2002). "an update". Infections in Medicine. 19: 4.
- Montero, JA; Herman, B; Bartels, LJ; Sinnott, JT (2002). "Tuberculous otitis". Infections in Medicine. 19: 2.
- Rosenbach, KA; Sinnott, JT (2001). "Vaccines in the 21st Century". Infections in Medicine. 18: 8.
- Vincent, A.L.; Vicencio, R.P.; Greene, John; Sandin, R.L.; Sinnott, John (2001-03-01). "Botfly Myiasis in a Returning Traveler". Infections in Medicine. 18 (3): 163–166 – via ResearchGate.
- Montero JA, Sinnott JT, Holt DA, Lloyd C (2001). "Biliary cryptosporidiosis: current concepts". Infections in Medicine. 18 (6): 312–316 – via ResearchGate.
- Larkin JA, Lit L, Sinnott JT, Wills T. Infection of a knee prosthesis with Tsukamurella species. A case report. South Med J 1999; 92:831-2
- Larkin, JA; Minerva, K; Sinnott, JT (1999). "HIV primer [Book Review]". JAMA. 281: 24.
- Cottam, JA; Shenefelt, PD; Sinnott, JT; Stevens, GL; Cancio, M; Sakalosky, PE (1999). "Common skin infections in the elderly". Infections in Medicine. 16: 4.
- Mastorides SM, Oehler RL, Greene JN, Sinnott JT, Kranik M, Sandin RL. The detection of airborne mycobacterium tuberculosis using micropore membrane air sampling and polymerase chain reaction. Chest 1999 Jan; 115(1):19-25
- Sinnott JT, Kneer C, Holt D, Ganguly R. Exposure of medical students to body fluids. J of Am Coll Health 1999 Mar; 47(5):207-10
- Lynch CM, Sinnott JT, Shashy, RG, Murphy SJ. Acute fatty liver of pregnancy: a confusing clinical entity. Hospital Phys 1999
- Sarria, JC; Sinnott, JT; Martin, DH (1998). "An AIDS patient with fever and a cough". Infections in Medicine. 15: 1.
- Larkin, JA; Ubillos, SS; Sinnott, JT; Houston, SH (1998). "Infection prophylaxis after occupational exposure to HIV: a simple approach". The AIDS Read. 8: 3.
- Ormerod LD, Sinnott JT, et al. Rapidly progressive herpetic retinal necrosis: a blinding complication of advanced AIDS. Clin Infect Dis 1998 Jan; 26(1):34-35
- Schwandt, R; Callahan, C; Greene, JN; Sinnott, JT; D'Agostino, A; Sandin, RL (1997). "Actinomycosis mimicking metastatic lung cancer". Infections in Medicine. 14 (10): 791–98.
- Lynch, CM; Pinelli, DM; Cruse, CW; Spellacy, WN; Sinnott, JT; Shashey, RG (1997). "Maternal death from postpartum necrotizing fasciitis arising in an episiotomy: a case report". Infect Dis Obstet Gynecol. 5 (5): 341–4. doi:10.1155/S1064744997000598. PMC 2364577. PMID 18476182.

== Honors, decorations, awards and distinctions ==
- Honorary Medical Staff Officer, 2001
- Tree of Life Award, 1996
- Founding Physician Award, Protective Care Unit, 1989
- President's Circle of Excellence, 1987–1988
- ECSS Award for Educational Excellence, Office of Education, 2011–2012
- Inspire by Example Award, USF Student Affairs, 2011
- Dean's Academic Performance Award, 2008–2009
- Charter Class Mentor, USF Health Leadership Institute, 2006 – present
- Faculty, Alpha Omega Alpha, 1989 – present
- Silver Performance Award for Outstanding Contributions, College of Medicine, Department of Internal Medicine, 2006–2007
- Gold Circle Honoree, 2004
- Honors and Awards Council, 1999–2002
- Charge to the Graduating Class, College of Medicine, 2001
- Charge to the Graduating Class, College of Medicine, 2000
- Honorary Alumnus, Alumnae Association, 1998
- Provost's Award, Faculty-Staff Scholarship Campaign, 1997
- Lifetime Appreciation Award, Division of Infectious Diseases, 1996
- Outstanding Service Award, Division of Infectious Disease, 1992
- Most Outstanding Clinical Professor, 1987, 1988, 1989, 1990, 1991, 1992 (Award retired and renamed "John T. Sinnott Award for Outstanding Clinical Professor," 1992)
- Faculty Sponsor, Watson Clinic Award for Outstanding Senior Student Research, 1989, 1991, 1992
- Fund-Raising Recognition Award, Faculty Staff Scholarship Campaign, 1990
- 2nd Place Award, Faculty Sponsor, Student Research Day, 1990
- Founding Physician Award, Moffitt Cancer Center Institute, 1986
- Outstanding House Officer Award, 1978
- Phi Sigma Honor Society, Tampa, Florida, 1973
- Patients’ Choice Award, 2012
- Certificate of Appreciation for “Care of military veterans and education of physicians and colleagues from 2000 to 2012”, James A. Haley Veterans Hospital, 2012
- Health Care Educator Award, Tampa Bay Business Journal's Health Care Heroes, 2011
- Citation: Elected by Peers for Inclusion in Best Doctors in America, 1996–2004 and 2007–2012
- Citation: Leon G. Smith Infectious Disease Institute Hall Of Fame, 2000 – present
- Citation: Naifeh S and Smith GW. The Best Doctors in America, 2001–present
- Citation: Who's Who in America and Science and Engineering, 1997 – present
- Citation: International Who's Who for Professionals, 1996 – present
- Finalist, Physician Mentor Recognition Program, American Medical Association – Women Physicians Congress, 2007
- Leadership Florida Distinguished Member Award, Tampa, Florida, 2007
- Service Awards, Department of Homeland Security and Immigration Enforcement “In Recognition of ICE Training.” Presented by Phil Ashton, Immigration Customs Enforcement, Lantana, Florida, 2007
- Lifetime Achievement Award, The AIDS Institute, for “Longtime Dedication to HIV/AIDS Prevention, Treatment, and Research in the United States and Internationally,” Tampa, 2006
- Julia B. Williams Award for Service to Hillsborough County Community College Foundation, 2005
- Because We Care Award, Florida Liver Association, Tampa, Florida, 2004
- Leadership Florida Class XXI Graduate, 2003
- Florida HIV/AIDS Red Ribbon Excellence Award, Bureau of HIV/AIDS, Florida AIDS Action, 2003
- Citation: Best Doctors in Tampa, chosen by Doctors, Tampa Bay Magazine, February 2001, 2003
- Finalist, Humanism in Medicine Award, Association of American Medical Colleges, 2001
- Citation: Strathmore's Who's Who, 2001
- Citation: Lexington Who's Who, 2000
- National Beth Israel Humanism Award, NBI Healthcare Foundation, 1998
- AIDS Education Award for Dedication and Support of AIDS Education, 1997
- AIDS Service Award, FACT (For AIDS Care Today) St. Petersburg, Florida, 1997
- Leadership in Medical Education Award, Florida Medical Association, Jacksonville, Florida, 1994
