= Livedo racemosa =

Purplish, irregular pattern of skin discoloration

- Specialty: Dermatology

Livedo racemosa is a skin condition with persistent red or violet discoloration, characterised by a broken, branched, discontinuous, and irregular pattern. It can be restricted to the limbs or diffuse. It is usually the first sign of a systemic vascular disorder. Many cases do not have a clear cause. Other diagnoses associated with livido racemosa include Sneddon's syndrome, cutaneous polyarteritis nodosa, and systemic lupus erythematosus.

== See also ==
- Livedo reticularis
- Livedoid dermatitis
- List of cutaneous conditions
