= Retiform purpura =

- Specialty: Dermatology
- Symptoms: persistent dark red to dark purple hemorrhagic skin patches or plaques
- Causes: vessel wall damage (vasculitis/depositional disease/angioinvasion by organism) or vessel lumen occlusion (thrombotic or embolic disease)
- Treatment: Underlying cause and would care including circulatory support

Retiform purpura is the result of total vascular blockage and damage to the skin's blood vessels. The skin then shows lesions, appearing due to intravascular issues where clots, proteins, or emboli block skin vessels. They can also result from direct harm to the vessel walls, as seen in conditions like vasculitis, calciphylaxis, and certain severe opportunistic infections.

== Pathophysiology ==
Retiform purpura is a cutaneous morphology characterized by a branching (reticular), non-blanching (purpuric) patch, plaque, or lesion that develops when blood vessels supplying the skin become obstructed. This blockage leads to downstream cutaneous ischemia, or insufficient blood supply to the skin, causing purpura, necrosis, and potentially ulceration. The obstruction in the dermal and subcutaneous vasculature results in hemorrhage secondary to skin ischemia, which can further lead to skin necrosis and ulceration. This morphology can occur in a variety of disorders.

== Signs and symptoms ==
Retiform purpura can present as non-raised large patches of purpura, with angulated or net-like border. They can present as painful dark red or purple patches or plaques with bordering branching and central purpura, necrosis, and/or ulceration. They can vary in size from small (1–2 cm) to large (>10 cm), and may be single or multiple, localized or disseminated. The branching may only be seen at the edge of one or two lesions but is still the clue to this diagnosis and a potentially serious underlying condition. Inflammatory retiform purpura consists of redness around the lesion with associated central necrosis caused by vasculitic or infectious processes. Noninflammatory retiform purpura refers to lesions with central necrosis with surrounding redness caused by the occlusive process. There can be significant overlap between these two classifications. Pain within lesions is common and may be severe.

== Associated disorders ==
There are several vasculopathy disorders that can present with retiform purpura. Some thrombotic and coagulopathic disorders are disseminated intravascular coagulation (DIC), hypercoagulable states (like antiphospholipid antibodies), thrombotic thrombocytopenic purpura (TTP), warfarin-induced skin necrosis, heparin-induced thrombocytopenia, and paroxysmal nocturnal hemoglobinuria. Some intravascular protein deposition diseases causing retiform purpura are cryoglobulinemia (type I), cryofibrinogenemia, and paraproteinemia. Some embolic disorders that may lead to retiform purpura include cholesterol emboli, septic emboli, atrial myxoma, or other manifestations like nonbacterial thrombotic endocarditis (marantic endocarditis, Libman-Sacks endocarditis) and hypereosinophilic syndrome. Some vessel wall pathology resulting in retiform purpura could be vasculitis, septic vasculitis, vasculitis related to autoimmune disease or primary systemic vasculitis, or cryoglobulinemic vasculitis (cryoglobulinemia types 2 and 3).

Other manifestation of retiform purpura can be seen in opportunistic infections, calciphylaxis, primary hyperoxaluria, livedoid vasculopathy, pyoderma gangrenosum, and vasculopathy or vasculitis due to levamisole-contaminated cocaine.

The onset of widespread purpura, known as purpura fulminans, is a dangerous condition associated with disseminated intravascular coagulation (DIC). Determining the root cause of DIC is crucial for treatment. In severe opportunistic infections, retiform purpura can also emerge. It is vital to quickly assess patients showing signs of purpura fulminans, especially if they exhibit symptoms of sepsis, serious sickness, or have weakened immune systems.

== Patient assessment and management ==
A detailed history and physical examination are essential for patients with retiform purpura, as they can offer significant insights for diagnosis. Specifically, evaluating the skin's color and the spread of purpura is crucial. Skin biopsies of retiform purpura can be instrumental in diagnosing suspected retiform purpura, specifically a punch or an excisional wedge biopsy. If infection is suspected, a tissue culture with initial lab workup.

Because the disease manifests in several ways, it is crucial to obtain the underlying etiology when determining treatment plans.
