= Livedoid vasculopathy =

Blood vessel disorder causing ulcers in the lower limbs

- Other names: Livedoid vasculitis, Livedo reticularis with summer/winter ulceration, Segmental hyalinizing vasculitis.
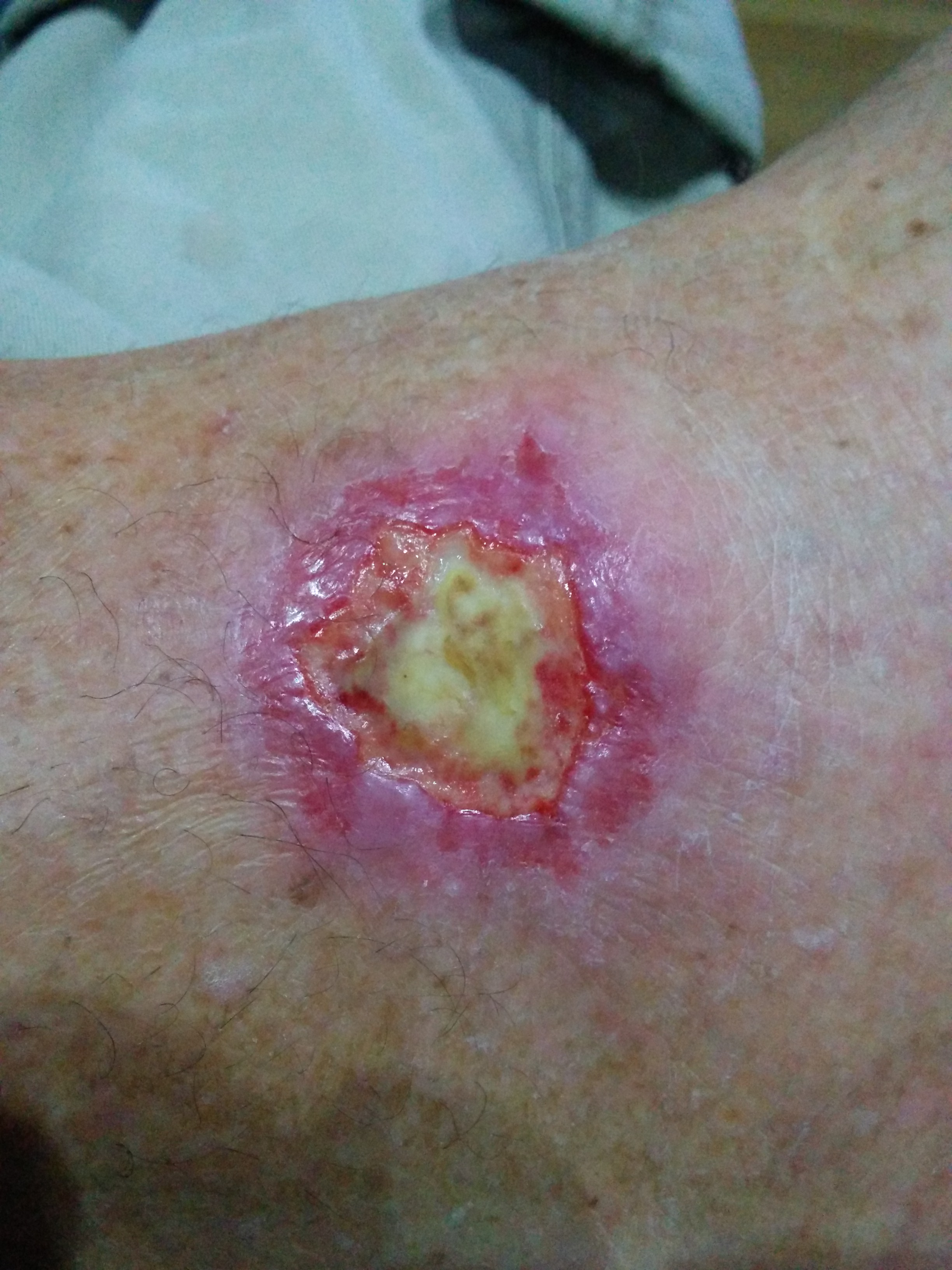
- Livedoid vasculopathy ulcer at the ankle
- Specialty: Dermatology
- Symptoms: Livedoid changes, atrophie blanche, and uclers.
- Risk factors: Antiphospholipid antibodies, thrombosis-predisposing genetic disorders, and paraproteinemias.
- Diagnostic method: Histopathology.
- Differential diagnosis: Chronic venous disease, peripheral vascular disease, and vasculitis.
- Treatment: Pain management, wound care, smoking cessation, compression, antiplatelet agent, and anticoagulants.
- Frequency: 1 in 1,00,000 per year.

Livedoid vasculopathy (LV) is an uncommon thrombotic dermal vasculopathy that is characterized by excruciating, recurrent ulcers on the lower limbs. Livedo racemosa, along with painful ulceration in the distal regions of the lower extremities, is the characteristic clinical appearance. It heals to form porcelain-white, atrophic scars, also known as Atrophie blanche.

Livedoid vasculopathy has been linked to various conditions that can induce hypercoagulability, including neoplasms, autoimmune connective-tissue diseases, and inherited and acquired thrombophilias.

The history, clinical findings, and histopathological analysis are combined to make the diagnosis.

Prompt and suitable intervention mitigates discomfort and averts the formation of wounds and additional complications. In addition to general supportive measures, anticoagulants and antiplatelet medications can be considered the first-line treatments.

== Signs and symptoms ==
Recurrent focal non-inflammatory thrombosis of the superior superficial and medium dermal venulae, particularly on the lower extremities, bilaterally, is the initial clinical manifestation; upper extremity involvement has also been documented. Livedo racemosa or, less commonly, livedo reticularis are symptoms of such thrombosis, which causes blood and pressure to build up in the dermal superficial veins. The oxygen partial pressure in the skin decreases as a result of the blood flow obstruction, triggering a cutaneous response that presents as pruritus with itchy papules and erythematous-violaceous, purpuric plaques. They quickly develop into bleeding vesicles, or bullae, which, when they burst, produce painful, small ulcers about 5 mm in diameter. These ulcers eventually combine to form painful, confluent, reticulate, and geometric ulcerations.

=== Complications ===
Due to the tissue exposure, the primary acute complications are pain and secondary infection. Atrophic scars, persistent hyperpigmentation, mononeuritis multiplex from vasa nervorum thrombosis, and cutaneous hemosiderosis in the lower limbs from erythrocytes oozing from the high-pressure regimen veins due to hemosiderin deposits in the skin are among the chronic complications associated with livedoid vasculopathy.

== Causes ==
Few things are known about the origins of dermal vessel thrombosis in livedoid vasculopathy, what sets off its initial episodes and relapses, and why it primarily affects the lower limbs.

=== Risk factors ===
Livedoid vasculopathy has been linked to rheumatoid arthritis, systemic lupus erythematosus, scleroderma, polyarteritis nodosa, mixed and undifferentiated connective tissue diseases, and Sjogren's syndrome. Individuals with systemic lupus erythematosus who also have antiphospholipid antibody syndrome are more vulnerable.

Patients with hematological or solid organ cancers may also experience livedoid vasculopathy. Livedoid vasculopathy may deteriorate during pregnancy, particularly in the third trimester, though fetal compromise has not been documented. Still, a sizable fraction of cases are idiopathic.

=== Genetics ===
Livedoid vasculopathy is caused by a number of inherited and acquired coagulation abnormalities, such as polymorphisms in factor V, plasminogen activator inhibitor-1 (PAI-1), prothrombin, and methylenetetrahydrofolate reductase (MTHFR).

== Mechanism ==
At this point, the pathomechanism of livedoid vasculopathy is not fully understood. At first, livedoid vasculopathy was thought to be vasculitis. Presently, livedoid vasculopathy is understood to be a vascular illness in which procoagulatory factors predominate, resulting in hypercoagulability. Defects in endothelial dysfunction, such as reduced plasminogen activation, platelet dysfunction, or increased or restricted fibrin formation or lysis, may be the cause of the thrombotic effect. As a diffusion barrier, fibrin deposition and thrombus formation cause a reduction in oxygen availability, which causes necrosis. Furthermore, insufficient tissue perfusion results in inadequate wound healing, creating a vicious cycle. The so-called Virchow trias, hypercoagulability, stasis, and endothelial damage, also serve as risk factors for livedoid vasculopathy microvascular thrombosis. The manifestation of livedoid vasculopathy on the lower extremities is thought to be caused by variations in temperature and perfusion pressure, as well as a lower concentration of thrombolytic factors.

== Diagnosis ==
To diagnose livedoid vasculopathy and its causes, a thorough history, dermatological examination, and laboratory work-up are necessary. A skin biopsy should be performed to confirm the diagnosis of livedoid vasculopathy when it is clinically suspected. The most suitable type of biopsy is a fusiform incisional biopsy that contains subcutaneous fat.

Skin biopsies' histology reveals endothelial proliferation, fibrin deposition in the vessel walls (which is frequently difficult to identify), and a high frequency of intraluminal hyaline thrombi in blood vessels, particularly in the upper and middle dermis, during the acute phase. Leukocytoclasia and a spare perivascular inflammatory infiltrate may be seen in the acute phase, but these results are not essential for the diagnosis.

Following histopathological confirmation of the diagnosis, a more thorough evaluation of any potential underlying illnesses may be conducted. Naturally, the first steps in the assessment process should be a thorough history, a review of the systems, and a physical examination to look for any signs of underlying diseases. For every patient, thrombophilia laboratory testing is advised. More testing is necessary to determine whether thrombophilia is inherited or acquired, including looking into coagulating factors and their mutations.

In the event that pertinent data suggestive of connective tissue diseases, such as scleroderma, rheumatoid arthritis, antiphospholipid antibody syndrome, systemic lupus erythematosus, and mixed connective tissue disease, detailed laboratory research should be conducted. Furthermore, when paraproteinemia or solid organ cancers are suspected, tests for protein electrophoresis, Ig kappa and lambda chain levels, and immunofixation should be carried out. Again, testing for HIV and hepatitis should be done if there is a suspicion of an underlying infection.

The initial step in the clinical work-up should be considering the differential diagnoses of additional common causes of atrophie blanche. Vasculitis, peripheral arterial vascular disease, and lower extremity chronic venous insufficiency are the most frequent conditions to be taken into account during the differential diagnosis process. Peripheral artery diseases are diagnosed with the help of clinical signs, abnormal arterial Doppler ultrasound findings, and the ankle-brachial index test. Cutaneous polyarteritis nodosa is another common differential diagnosis that causes similar cutaneous lesions on the legs. A proper skin biopsy can help differentiate vasculitis from livedoid vasculopathy.

== Treatment ==
Although there are numerous distinct treatment modalities for livedoid vasculopathy, no published, standardized, evidence-based therapeutic strategies exist. The improvement of skin lesions, avoidance of relapses, and pain relief are the main goals of treatment for livedoid vasculopathy. Since not every patient responds to a single therapy approach equally, it is necessary to evaluate or combine a number of treatment options.

Treating pain related to ulcers with analgesia is crucial and frequently the patients' top priority. UV light, compression, hyperbaric oxygen, and routine wound debridement are examples of local therapies for livedoid vasculopathy. Hyperbaric oxygen and compression therapy have been demonstrated to enhance fibrinolysis in addition to their respective roles in reducing edema and mitigating reperfusion injury.

The most widely documented treatment for livedoid vasculopathy is oral anticoagulation, which directly addresses dermal vessel thrombosis. The most widely used of these is rivaroxaban, which showed a significant reduction in pain after 12 weeks of therapy in an uncontrolled phase 2a trial. Common substitutes are antiplatelet agents like aspirin and pentoxifylline. Patients who are not responding to traditional therapies may benefit from the use of low-dose systemic thrombolytics.

== Epidemiology ==
According to estimates, the annual incidence of livedoid vasculopathy is 1:100,000, with women being affected at a ratio of 3:1. Patients may experience functional impairment for decades as the mean age of onset is in the 30s.

== See also ==
- Livedo reticularis
- Antiphospholipid syndrome
