= Livedoid dermatitis =

Painful discoloring skin reaction to drug injection

- Other names: Embolia cutis medicamentosa, Nicolau syndrome
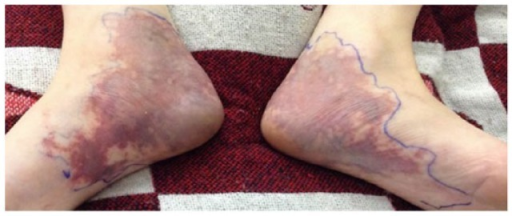
- Feet affected by livedoid dermatitis
- Specialty: Dermatology

Livedoid dermatitis is a iatrogenic cutaneous reaction that occurs immediately after a drug injection. It presents as an immediate, extreme pain around the injection site, with overlying skin rapidly becoming erythematous, violaceous, or blanched ("ischemic pallor") and sometimes with reticular pattern. The reaction eventually leads to variable degrees of necrosis to the skin and underlying tissue. The wound eventually heals, but can lead to atrophic, disfiguring scarring.

The reaction is associated with a range of both injection sites and drugs. It was first reported by Freudenthal in 1924 following an injection of bismuth salts for syphilis. Although initial reports were following intramuscular injections, the reaction has since also been reported following subcutaneous, intravenous, and intraarticular injections. Livedoid dermatitis has been reported to occur with many different drug injections, including: penicillins, local anesthetics (e.g. lidocaine), vaccines (e.g. Dtap), corticosteroids, NSAIDs, and more.

== Pathogenesis ==
The cause of this condition is poorly understood. Microscopic examination of affected tissue shows ischemic necrosis, and so various hypotheses exist to explain this ischemia, including vasospasm from needle prick, the injected drug, or cold compresses applied to the wound.

== Diagnosis ==
The diagnosis is mainly clinical. Skin biopsies of the site show necrosis caused by ischemia. Radiographic imaging may help to delineate the extent of the wound.

== Treatment ==
Depending on the extent and state of infection of the wound, the condition may require antibiotics, wound debridement in early stages, and corrective plastic surgery in late stages.

== See also ==
- Injection site reactions
- List of cutaneous conditions
