= Arterial switch operation =

Open heart surgical procedure

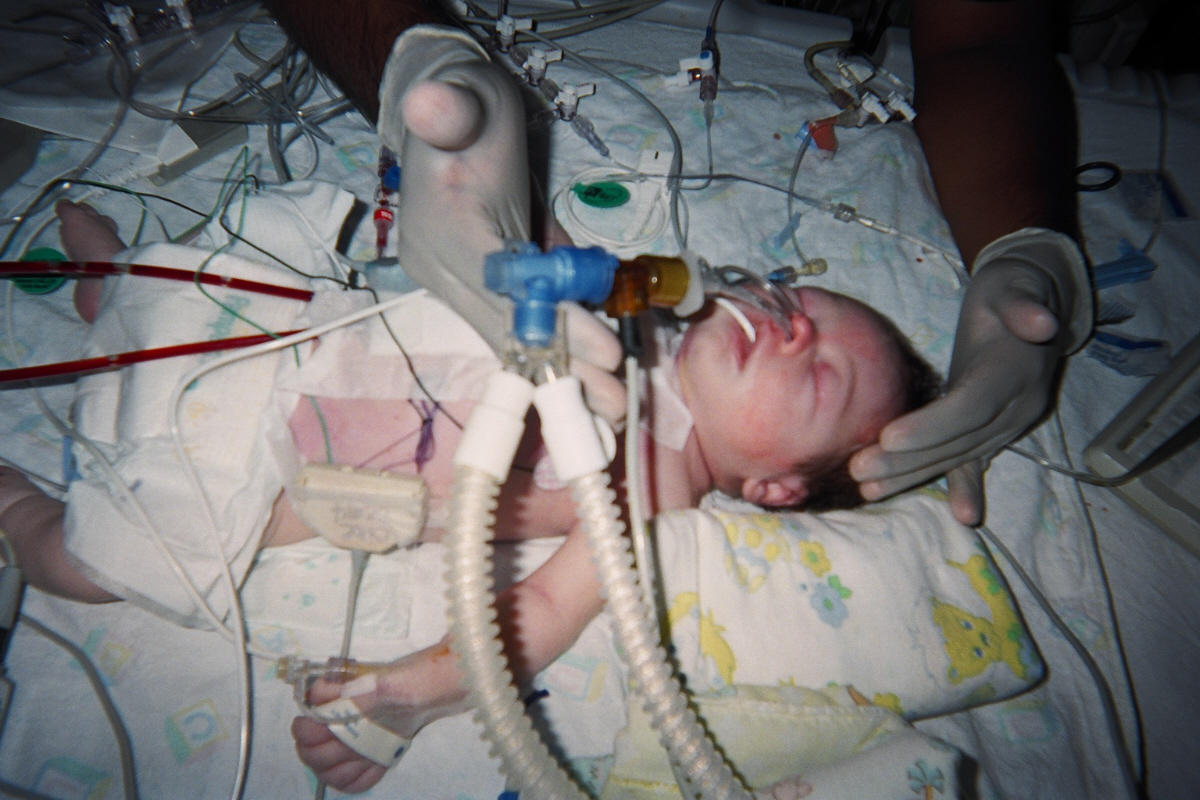
- An 8-day-old right after the Jatene procedure
- Other names: Jatene procedure
- ICD-9-CM: 35.84

Arterial switch operation (ASO), arterial switch, or Jatene procedure is an open heart surgical procedure used to correct dextro-transposition of the great arteries (d-TGA).

Its development was pioneered by Canadian cardiac surgeon William Mustard and it was named for Brazilian cardiac surgeon Adib Jatene, who was the first to use it successfully. It was the first method of d-TGA repair to be attempted, but the last to be put into regular use because of technological limitations at the time of its conception.

Use of the arterial switch is historically preceded by two atrial switch methods: the Senning and Mustard procedures.

The atrial switch, which was an attempt to correct the physiology of transposition, had significant shortcomings that the arterial switch improved upon, in particular a reduced kinking of the coronary arteries when combined with the LeCompte maneuver. The end result is that the aorta is repositioned behind the pulmonary arteries, functionally lengthening it and causing less angulation at the coronary origins.

== Timing ==
The Jatene procedure is ideally performed during the second week of life, before the left ventricle adjusts to the lower pulmonary pressure and is therefore unable to support the systemic circulation. In the event of sepsis or delayed diagnosis, a combination of pulmonary artery banding (PAB) and shunt construction may be used to increase the left ventricular mass sufficiently to make an arterial switch possible later in infancy.

== Prognosis ==
The success of ASO procedure is largely dependent on the facilities available, the skill and experience of the surgeon, and the general health of the patient. Under preferable conditions, the intra-operative and post-operative success rate is 90% or more, with a comparable survival rate after 5 years. Approximately 10% of arterial switch recipients develop residual pulmonary stenosis post-operatively, which can lead to right heart failure if left untreated; treatment usually involves endovascular stenting and/or xenograft patching.

=== Overview ===
- General anaesthesia and cardiopulmonary bypass are used.
- The aorta and pulmonary artery are transected from the heart and reattached to the opposite root; thus, the pulmonary root becomes the neo-aorta, and the aortic root becomes the neo-pulmonary artery.
- The coronary arteries are transplanted from the aorta/neo-pulmonary artery to the pulmonary artery/neo-aorta.
- Length of procedure, from initiation of anaesthesia to post-operative cease thereof, is approximately 6–8 hours.

=== Preparatory ===
If the procedure is anticipated far enough in advance (with prenatal diagnosis, for example), and the individual's blood type is known, a family member with a compatible blood type may donate some or all of the blood needed for transfusion during the use of a heart-lung machine (HLM). The patient's mother is normally unable to donate blood for the transfusion, as she will not be able to donate blood during pregnancy (due to the needs of the fetus) or for a few weeks after giving birth (due to blood loss), and the process of collecting a sufficient amount of blood may take several weeks to a few months. However, in cases where the individual has been diagnosed but surgery must be delayed, maternal (or even autologous, in certain cases) blood donation may be possible, as long as the mother has a compatible blood type. In most cases, though, the patient receives a donation from a blood bank. A blood transfusion is necessary for the arterial switch because the HLM needs its "circulation" filled with blood and an infant does not have enough blood on their own to do this (in most cases, an adult would not require blood transfusion).

The patient will require a number of imaging procedures in order to determine the individual anatomy of the great arteries and, most importantly, the coronary arteries. These may include angiography, magnetic resonance imaging (MRI), and/or computed tomography (CT scan). The coronary arteries are carefully mapped out in order to avoid unexpected intra-operative complications in transferring them from the native aorta to the neo-aorta.

=== Pre-operative ===
As with any procedure requiring general anaesthesia, arterial switch recipients will need to fast for several hours prior to the surgery to avoid the risk of aspiration of vomitus during the induction of anesthesia.

As the patient is anesthetized, they may receive the following drugs, which continue as necessary throughout the procedure:

- Inhalational anaesthetic
- muscle relaxant, to induce temporary paralysis
- opioid analgesic, to manage pain, cause sedation and induce serenity
- Aprotinin, or other antifibrinolytic, to prevent excessive bleeding
- Methylprednisolone, to reduce swelling and inflammation
- Prophylactic antibiotics, to prevent infection

=== Intra-operative ===
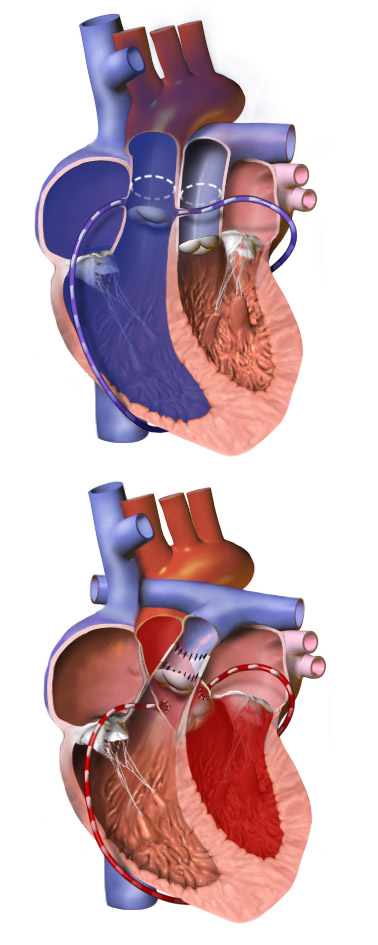
Illustration of arterial switch operation

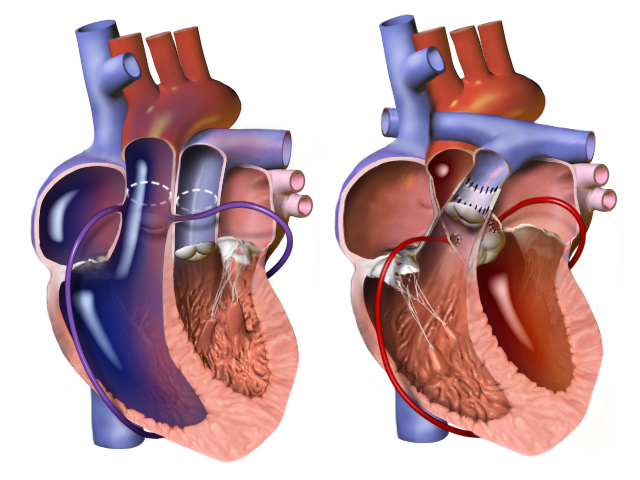
Illustration of arterial switch operation

The heart is accessed via median sternotomy and its pericardium is removed so the coronary and great arteries can be seen. The ductus arteriosus and main right pulmonary artery, up to and including the first branches in the hilum of the right lung, are separated from the surrounding supportive tissue to allow mobility of the vessels. Cardiopulmonary bypass is then initiated and the body is cooled to prevent the brain damage otherwise associated with low blood flow during the surgery.

While the patient is cooling, the ductus arteriosus is ligated at both the aortic and pulmonary ostia, then transected at its center; the main left pulmonary artery including its first branches in the left hilum, is separated from surrounding connective tissue. When the patient is fully cooled, the ascending aorta is clamped and cardioplegia is achieved by delivering cold blood to the heart via the ascending aorta (below the cross clamp). The aorta and pulmonary arteries are surgically cut. The vessels are again examined, and the pulmonary root is inspected for left ventricular outflow tract obstruction. If a ventricular septal defect is present, it is also repaired via the aortic or pulmonary valve.

The great arteries are usually arranged using the LeCompte maneuver, with the aortic cross clamp positioned to hold the pulmonary artery anterior to the ascending aorta. On imaging, the pulmonary arteries will classically have the appearance of being draped over the aorta. Sometimes, however, patient anatomy prevents this and the aorta great vessels are kept in the non-anatomic 'anterior aorta' arrangement. The coronary arteries infundibular branches and the aortic root extending the sinus of Valsalva are then surgically cut off the native aorta and transplanted onto the pulmonary root to make a neo-aorta.

The bypass machine is then turned off, an incision is made in the right atrium, through which the congenital or palliative atrial septal defect is repaired. In septal defects where a Rashkind balloon atrial septostomy was used, the ASD should be able to be closed with sutures, but cases involving large congenital atrial septal defects or Blalock-Hanlon atrial septectomy, a patch can be used.

If there is a ventricular septal defect which has not yet been repaired, this is also fixed through the atrial incision and tricuspid valve, again using sutures for a small defect or a patch for a large defect.

When the septal defects have been repaired and the atrial incision is closed, the patient is again placed on cardiopulmonary pass. The left ventricle is then vented and the cross clamp removed from the aorta, enabling full-flow to be re-established and rewarming to begin. At this point the patient will receive an additional dose of Regitine to keep blood pressure under control. The previously harvested pericardium is then used to patch the coronary explantation sites, and to extend and widen the neo-pulmonary root, which allows the pulmonary artery to be anastamosed without residua tension; the pulmonary artery is then transplanted to the neo-pulmonary root.

=== Final stages ===
The patient is fitted with chest tubes, temporary pacemaker leads, and ventilated before weaning from the HLM is begun.

- inotrope, to assist the heart in contracting adequately

The rib cage is relaxed and the external surgical wound is bandaged, but the sternum and chest incision are left open to provide extra room in the pleural cavity, allowing the heart room to swell and preventing pressure caused by pleural effusion.

=== Post-operative ===
The sternum and chest can usually be closed within a few days; however, the chest tubes, pacemaker, ventilator, and drugs may still be required after this time. The patient will continue to fast for up to a few days, and breastmilk or infant formula can then be gradually introduced via nasogastric tube (NG tube); the primary goal after a successful arterial switch, and before hospital discharge, is for the infant to gain back the weight they have lost and continue to gain weight at a normal or near-normal rate.

== History ==
Scottish pathologist Matthew Baillie first described TGA in 1797, presumably as a posthumous diagnosis. Without surgical correction, preoperative mortality in the neonate is approximately 30% within the first week of life and up to 90% within the first year; the survivors would have been those with one or more concomitant intracardiac shunts (ASD, patent ductus arteriosus (PDA), patent foramen ovale (PFO), and/or VSD), and are unlikely to have survived past adolescence.

In 1950, American surgeons Alfred Blalock and C. Rollins Hanlon introduced the Blalock-Hanlon atrial septectomy, which was then routinely used to palliate patients. This would have effectively reduced early mortality rates, particularly in cases with no concomitant shunts, but is unlikely to have reduced late mortality rates.

Mustard first conceived of, and attempted, the anatomical repair (arterial switch) for d-TGA in the early 1950s. His few attempts were unsuccessful due to technical difficulties posed by the translocation of the coronary arteries, and the idea was abandoned.

Swedish cardiac surgeon Åke Senning described the first corrective surgery for d-TGA (the Senning procedure) in 1959, which involved using the atrial septum to create an intratrial baffle that redirected bloodflow at the atrial level; Senning yielded a high success rate using this procedure, significantly lowering both early and late mortality rates.

Due to the technical complexity of the Senning procedure, others could not duplicate his success rate; in response, Mustard developed a simpler alternative method (the Mustard procedure) in 1964, which involved constructing a baffle from autologous pericardium or synthetic material, such as Dacron. This procedure yielded early and late mortality rates comparable to the Senning procedure; however, a late morbidity rate was eventually discovered in relation to the use of synthetic graft material, which does not grow with the recipient and eventually causes obstruction.

In 1966, American surgeons William Rashkind and William Miller transformed the palliation of d-TGA patients with the innovative Rashkind balloon atrial septostomy, which, unlike the thoracotomy required by a septectomy, is performed through the minimally invasive surgical technique of cardiac catheterization.

The late morbidity rate is high in atrial switch, combined with advances in microvascular surgery, created a renewed interest in Mustard's original concept of an arterial switch procedure. The first successful arterial switch was performed on a forty-two-day-old d-TGA + VSD infant by Jatene in 1975. Egyptian cardiac surgeon Magdi Yacoub was subsequently successful in treating TGA with AN intact interventricular septum when preceded by pulmonary artery banding and systemic-to-pulmonary shunt palliation. Austrian surgeon B. Eber was the first to recount a small series of successful arterial switch procedures, and the first large successful series was reported by Guatemalan surgeon Aldo R. Casteneda. In the postoperative period, increased incidence and degree of supravalvular pulmonary stenosis. Eliminating the pericardial patch for pulmonary artery reconstruction and using a direct connection reduced the incidence of this complication.

By 1991, the arterial switch had become the procedure of choice, and it remains the standard modern procedure for d-TGA repair.

As long-term results of arterial switch are being reported, newer sets of potential surgical problems are becoming evident. Progressive neo-aortic dilation (pulmonary valve at birth) has been observed. However, this dilation does not necessarily translate into aortic regurgitation (AR) and need for surgery in all patients. Older age at time of ASO, presence of ventricular septal defect, and previous PA banding have been found to be risk factors for AR. supravalvular pulmonary stenosis was commonly observed in the postoperative period. A direct connection of the pulmonary artery reduced the incidence of this complication

The world's smallest infant to survive an arterial switch was Jerrick De Leon, born 13 weeks premature. At the time of the operation on February 6, 2005, he weighed just over 1.5 pounds (700 grams).
