= LeCompte maneuver =

Technique used in open heart surgery, primarily on infants and children

The LeCompte maneuver is a technique used in open heart surgery, primarily on infants and children. The maneuver entails cutting the main pulmonary artery and moving it anterior to the aorta before reattaching the pulmonary artery during the following reconstruction of the great vessels. It allows the surgeon to reconstruct the right ventricular outflow tract without needing to connect the proximal and distal sections with a graft. It also enables the surgeon to avoid compressing the coronary arteries and relieves compression of the bronchi in cases where the pulmonary artery is severely dilated or aneurysmal. If both pulmonary arteries are not mobilized adequately, they can become stretched, leading to pulmonic stenosis.

Commonly, the maneuver is used during an arterial switch procedure (in which the pulmonary artery and aorta switch positions) or in surgery to correct absent pulmonary valve syndrome. It is also used in corrective surgeries for Tetralogy of Fallot where the pulmonary valve is anomalous, persistent truncus arteriosus with aortopulmonary window that affects the aortic arch, left-to-right shunts, anomalous right pulmonary artery, and ALCAPA (anomalous left coronary artery from the pulmonary artery). Other surgeries that regularly employ the LeCompte maneuver include the Yasui procedure, REV procedure, and Nikaidoh operation, all of which are used to reconstruct hearts with an anomalous left ventricular outflow tract.

The technique was first used in 1981 and described in 1982.
