= Absent pulmonary valve syndrome =

- Other names: Congenital absence of the pulmonary valve and Pulmonary valve agenesis
- Diagram of the human heart, with labels for chambers, valves, and blood vessels.
- Specialty: Cardiology

Absent pulmonary valve syndrome (APVS) is a congenital heart defect that occurs when the flaps of the pulmonary valve do not develop or are severely underdeveloped (hypoplasia) resulting in aneurysms (dilation) of the pulmonary arteries and softening of the trachea and bronchi (tracheobronchomalacia). Usually, APVS occurs together with other congenital heart defects, most commonly ventricular septal defect and right ventricular outflow tract obstruction. It is sometimes considered a variant of Tetralogy of Fallot. The first case of absent pulmonary valve syndrome was reported Crampton in 1830.

== Signs and symptoms ==
Symptoms include respiratory distress and variable cyanosis. Rarely, patients will present as asymptomatic.

== Causes ==
The most typical form of APVS is a tetralogy of Fallot variant, however, case studies have linked APVS to several different congenital cardiac syndromes, such as agenesis of ductus arteriosus, persistent ductus arteriosus, atrioventricular septal defect, pulmonary branching abnormalities, transposition of the great arteries, and type B interrupted aortic arch. About 25% of cases of absent pulmonary valve have been linked to chromosomal abnormalities, such as deletions on chromosomes 6 and 7, Trisomy 13, and Trisomy 21. About 25% of cases have a 22q11 microdeletion linked to it.

== Outcome ==
APVS has a poor prognosis. In addition to heart issues, the majority of newborns experience respiratory distress-related problems. Massive lobar emphysema may result from the compression of bronchi by dilated pulmonary arteries, which typically causes respiratory distress. The pulmonary artery's infundibulum's orientation regulates the pulmonary arteries' preferred dilatation as well. Infundibulum is typically vertical and brief. When the infundibulum in APVS is oriented horizontally and to the right, it causes the right pulmonary artery to dilate aneurysmally, further compressing the middle lobe bronchus. A left-oriented infundibulum causes the left pulmonary artery to dilate aneurysmically, compressing the left main and upper lobe bronchus.

== See also ==
- Tetralogy of Fallot
- Pulmonary Atresia
