= Baffle (medicine) =

Artificial tunnel or wall in the heart or great vessels

A baffle is a surgically created tunnel or wall within the heart or major blood vessels used to redirect the flow of blood. They are used in some types of heart abnormalities that a child is born with known as congenital heart defects. Baffles are usually constructed, at least in part, from a person's own heart tissue, while other methods of redirecting blood using artificial material are known by the more generic term 'conduits'.

Baffles can be made between different structures depending on the heart condition that needs to be treated.

== Dextro-transposition of the great arteries ==
In dextro-transposition of the great arteries, at the initial arterial switch a Jatene procedure is normally done in conjunction to switch the coronary arteries as well, as they originate from the aorta. The Jatene procedure is ideally performed during the second week of life, before the left ventricle adjusts to the lower pulmonary pressure. In cases where the Jatene is not performed in time, the left ventricle weakens and is consequently unable to contract against the higher arterial pressures of systemic circulation. In this scenario, a second procedure with an atrial switch is done after recovery from the first intervention.

The atrial switch is done via either the Mustard procedure, in which the atrial septum is cut out and a baffle is made with the pericardial baffle, or a Senning procedure, in which the atrial septum itself is used to create the baffle. The effect of either procedure is a physiologic atrial switch, redirecting blood from the superior and inferior vena cava to the left ventricle and blood from the pulmonary veins to the right ventricle, to treat transposition of the great arteries.

== Fontan procedure ==
The lateral tunnel form of the Fontan procedure uses a baffle to redirect blood from the inferior vena cava to the pulmonary arteries.
