= Yasui procedure =

- Specialty: Cardiology

The Yasui procedure is a pediatric heart operation used to bypass the left ventricular outflow tract (LVOT) that combines the aortic repair of the Norwood procedure and a shunt similar to that used in the Rastelli procedure in a single operation. It is used to repair defects that result in the physiology of hypoplastic left heart syndrome even though both ventricles are functioning normally. These defects are common in DiGeorge syndrome and include interrupted aortic arch and LVOT obstruction (IAA/LVOTO); aortic atresia-severe stenosis with ventricular septal defect (AA/VSD); and aortic atresia with interrupted aortic arch and aortopulmonary window. This procedure allows the surgeon to keep the left ventricle connected to the systemic circulation while using the pulmonary valve as its outflow valve, by connecting them through the ventricular septal defect. The Yasui procedure includes a modified Damus–Kaye–Stansel procedure to connect the aortic and pulmonary roots, allowing the coronary arteries to remain perfused. It was first described in 1987.

== Indications ==
A Yasui procedure can be done instead of a Norwood operation in some cases of LVOT obstruction to avoid committing a child to a single-ventricle heart, or it can follow a Norwood operation when the surgeon uses a staged approach. It is also used when the Ross procedure or Konno procedure are not feasible in children who have had other surgeries to repair coarctation of the aorta or interrupted aortic arch.

== Technique ==
The Yasui procedure is done via a median sternotomy and uses cardiopulmonary bypass. If there is a patent ductus arteriosus, the surgeon begins by closing it. The surgeon then connects the separated parts of the aorta together. The surgeon then transects the pulmonary artery and aorta and frees them from surrounding tissue, then makes an incision into the right ventricle to allow them to assess the ventricular septal defect and remove excess muscle bundles in cases of extensive right ventricular hypertrophy. If the ventricular septal defect is smaller than the pulmonary valve, the surgeon will enlarge the defect. The surgeon then uses a patch, commonly made of bovine (cow) pericardium or the child's own tissue, to create a tunnel between the ventricular septal defect and the pulmonary valve. This allows for blood to flow from the left ventricle to the pulmonary valve. After creating this tunnel, the surgeon connects the aortic and pulmonary roots (Damus-Kaye-Stansel anastomosis).

== Outcomes ==
Children typically have good cardiac function and survival after the Yasui procedure, similar to other operations for the same conditions. However, children may require re-operation to replace the conduit in their heart if they outgrow it. Long-term survival depends on other factors, such as genetic disease.
