= Senning procedure =

- Specialty: Congenital cardiac surgery

The Senning procedure is an atrial switch heart operation performed to treat transposition of the great arteries. It is named after its inventor, the Swedish cardiac surgeon Åke Senning (1915–2000), also known for implanting the first permanent cardiac pacemaker in 1958.

== Brief history ==
This procedure, a form of atrial switch, was developed and first performed by Senning in 1957 as a treatment for d-TGA (dextro-Transposition of the great arteries) before improvements in cardiopulmonary bypass made more curative surgical techniques feasible. In this congenital heart defect, the venous circulation drains into the right ventricle but from this chamber, blood is directed towards the systemic circulation through the aorta. This is also expressed by the term ventriculoarterial discordance, that is the ventricles are connected to the wrong great artery (the right ventricle to the aorta, thus pumping blood from the systemic venous back into the systemic arterial circulation). Thus, d-TGA is not to be confused with l-TGA, where there is both atrioventricular and ventriculoarterial discordance.

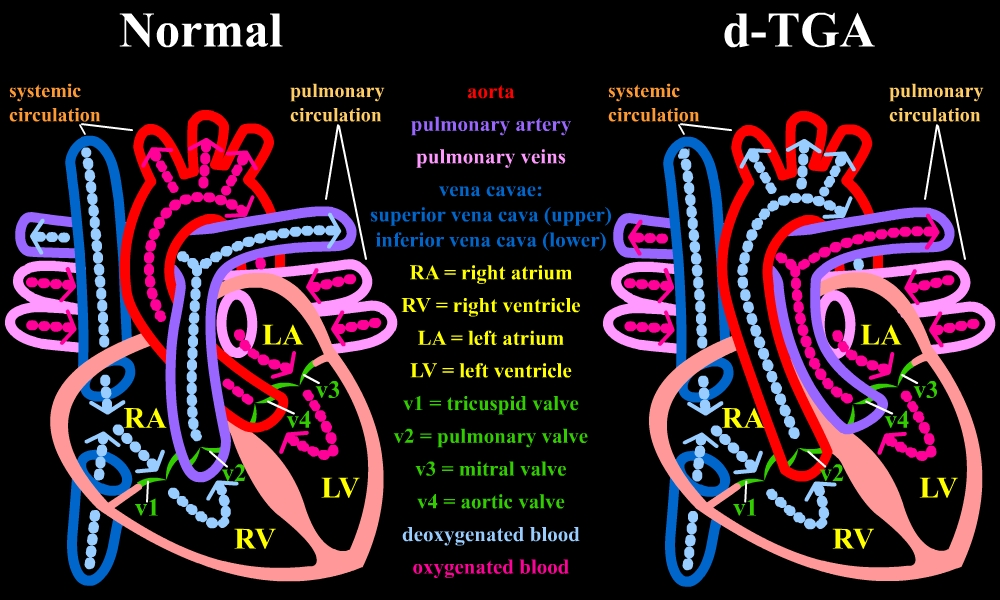
Schematic representation of d-TGA

In the absence of a shunt, patients with d-TGA could not survive because there would be no flow of oxygenated blood (coming from the pulmonary veins) to the rest of the body after the normal prenatal shunts physiologically close a few weeks after birth. This congenital heart defect caused babies to "turn blue" due to the lack of oxygen flowing through the blood. Before this technique became available, in 1950, two cardiac surgeons, Blalock and Hanlon, had developed a palliative procedure that consisted of opening the atrial septum. Since, in TGA, the atrial septum prevents oxygenated blood from reaching the systemic circulation, this simpler procedure leads to improvements in systemic arterial O2 saturation.

== Technical aspects ==
With the Senning surgical repair, a baffle – or conduit - is created within the atria that reroutes the deoxygenated blood coming from the inferior and superior vena cavae to the mitral valve and therefore to the pulmonary circulation This is accomplished by creating a systemic venous conduit that channels deoxygenated blood from the superior and inferior vena cava towards the mitral valve. After this complex plastic reconstruction using flaps from the right atrial tissue and the interatrial septum, it lets the oxygenated pulmonary venous blood flow to the tricuspid valve and from there to the systemic circulation. The anatomic left ventricle continues to pump into the pulmonary circulation and the anatomic right ventricle will work as the systemic pump, in other words, the ventriculo-arterial mismatch is left unrepaired. In the Senning's operation, atrial tissue is used to create the baffle. No prosthetic material is introduced. A complex work of incising and refolding the native atrial tissue - which is so technically complex that has been referred to as "origami", is necessary to build the venous baffle. Indeed, the Senning technique was difficult to reproduce and was not widely embraced.

In 1963, Mustard described an alternative technique, the Mustard procedure, in which the atrial septum is excised, and the atrial baffle is created by the placement of a single elephant trunk-shaped patch made of pericardial tissue. This technique then became the standard operation for TGA as it was technically less demanding.

== Alternative surgical techniques ==
Currently, the arterial switch or Jatene procedure is the preferred surgical corrective method. In this technique, the great arteries are excised and reimplanted to the corresponding ventricles. The Brazilian surgeon Jatene performed the first procedure in 1975. The coronary arteries are also explanted from the anatomical aorta, which lies on the venous side and reattached to the systemic great vessel. Indeed, the initial difficulties that prevented an earlier adoption of this approach were mostly the inability to transfer the coronary arteries, besides problems with early forms of cardiopulmonary bypass that made cardiac surgery in early infancy less safe than in the present times Some individuals with d-TGA are not candidates for an arterial switch, particularly because of late diagnosis, coexistent VSD with associated pulmonary hypertension, inadequate left ventricular function, or complex coronary abnormalities. Moreover, the Senning procedure is used as part of the double switch surgical correction of l-TGA ( Senning-Rastelli procedure).

== Mortality and later health effects ==
The acute mortality associated with the Senning procedure is reported to be around 5-10%. Patient selection and the complexity of the congenital malformation are determinants of mortality risk. Patients who have undergone such surgical correction of the congenital transposition are exposed to long-term risks of cardiovascular events. In particular, sinus node dysfunction, atrial arrhythmias, ventricular arrhythmias including sudden cardiac arrhythmic death, heart failure due to anatomically right ventricular failure, or venous obstruction at the level of the baffle or caval anatomy have been described. The high chance of developing arrhythmias results in up to 25% of patients who have undergone a Senning or Mustard procedure having a pacemaker by adulthood.

Long-term studies have disclosed that although from the functional capacity standpoint the Senning and the Mustard operation are similar, there is a higher risk of sinus node disease and arrhythmias with the latter. Overall, in most studies, survival is good into the second decade post-procedure. 78% of patients were alive after 16 years in a large follow-up study from the Netherlands.

Before the utilization of surgical repair, Kirklin reports that the mortality associated with unrepaired TGA was 55%, 85%, and 90% mortality rates at 1 month, 6 months, and 1 year, respectively. These numbers correspond to all types of TGA. A major factor affecting long-term morbidity and mortality is the coexistence of a ventricular septal defect (VSD). Patients with a concomitant VSD may have also developed pulmonary vascular disease.

== Support ==
A patient run Facebook group mustard and Senning survivors https://www.facebook.com/groups/mustsenn is for adults born with TGA and living with Senning repair. The group gathers well over a thousand global survivors in their 20s to 60's and even some survivors in their 70's into a single community, supporting adults born with TGA that have had a Mustard, Senning, Rastelli, Fontan repair or Nikaidoh heart procedure.
