= Pulmocutaneous circulation =

Part of the amphibian circulatory system

Pulmocutaneous circulation is part of the amphibian circulatory system. It is responsible for directing blood to the skin and lungs. Blood flows from the ventricle into an artery called the conus arteriosus and from there into either the left or right truncus arteriosus. They in turn each split the ventricle's output into the pulmocutaneous circuit and the systemic circuit.

== See also ==
- Double circulatory system
