= VTI =

VTI may refer to:

- Virtual TI (Virtual Texas Instruments Calculator)
- The Vanguard Group Total Stock Market ETF, an exchange-traded fund with ticker symbol VTI
- Velocity time integral, a measurement in echocardiography
- Vermeer Technologies, original developer of Microsoft FrontPage
- Volda TI, Norwegian sports club
- VTI trademark by VLSI Technology
- Video Terminal Interface (VTI), a video display interface of the polymorphic Poly-88
- Virtual Tunnel Interface, another method for route-based IPsec; see VyOS
- VTI Engine ("Variable valve lift and Timing Injection"), engine developed by PSA Peugeot Citroën and BMW
- Swedish National Road and Transport Research Institute, a transport research institute in Sweden
