= Aortopulmonary window =

Heart defect

- Other names: Aortopulmonary septal defect
- A chest X-ray showing an Aortopulmonary window.
- Specialty: Medical genetics
- Symptoms: Tachypnea, poor eating, left-to-right shunt, and diaphoresis.
- Complications: Heart murmurs, eisenmenger syndrome, and heart failure.
- Usual onset: Birth
- Diagnostic method: Physical examination findings, ECG, and imaging.
- Differential diagnosis: Truncus arteriosus, ventricular septal defect, and patent ductus arteriosus.
- Treatment: Heart surgery.
- Prognosis: 40% chance of death within the first year if left untreated.
- Frequency: 0.15-0.6% of all congenital heart malformations.

Aortopulmonary window (APW) is a faulty connection between the aorta and the main pulmonary artery that results in a significant left-to-right shunt. The aortopulmonary window is the rarest of septal defects, accounting for 0.15-0.6% of all congenital heart malformations. An aortopulmonary window can develop alone or in up to 50% of cases alongside other cardiac defects such as interrupted aortic arch, coarctation of the aorta, transposition of great vessels, and tetralogy of Fallot.

== Signs and symptoms ==
A left-to-right shunt can cause heart failure, with symptoms such as tachypnea, poor eating, and diaphoresis. Dyspnea and indications of laborious breathing can be caused by low lung compliance and increased airway resistance. Infants may have failure to thrive as well as recurrent pneumonia.

Findings among individuals with an isolated aortopulmonary window vary based on the size of the defect and the pulmonary vascular resistance. Cardiac examination typically indicates a parasternal lift resulting from right ventricular overload, a loud single second heart sound induced by pulmonary hypertension, and increased peripheral pulses.

When the defect is larger, pulmonary vascular resistance may continue to be elevated in the initial weeks or months of life, and there is a modest amount of pulmonary overcirculation. A rather faint basal systolic ejection murmur without a diastolic element and a loud single second heart sound develop due to mild overcirculation. As the pulmonary vascular resistance decreases throughout the first few months, the left-to-right shunting of blood into the lungs increases, and the systolic murmur becomes more intense and longer, eventually extending into diastole and becoming a continuous murmur.

=== Complications ===
Because there is a pressure gradient from the aorta to the pulmonary artery throughout systole and diastole, a small aortopulmonary defect may produce a murmur similar to a patent ductus arteriosus.

When a large defect is left unrepaired, Eisenmenger syndrome will develop with reversal of the shunt.

Untreated cases with major malformations have a poor prognosis, with 40% dying within their first year of life.

== Diagnosis ==
Physical examination findings, ECG, and imaging are used to diagnose aortopulmonary window. An electrocardiogram reveals right ventricular hypertrophy or biventricular hypertrophy. Cardiomegaly, a big main pulmonary artery segment, and enhanced pulmonary vascular marking are all visible on a chest x-ray.

=== Differential diagnosis ===
The appearance of aortopulmonary window has similarities to that of truncus arteriosus, ventricular septal defect, and large patent ductus arteriosus. A two-dimensional echocardiogram can detect and distinguish between these problems.

== Treatment ==
Corrective heart surgery, which is normally performed in the first year of life, is the definitive intervention for an aortopulmonary window. If the patient's symptoms don't allow for corrective surgery, medical therapy of congestive heart failure is the second choice. Permanent alterations in the pulmonary vasculature can be prevented with early intervention.

== See also ==
- Aortopulmonary space
- Aortic window
- Major aortopulmonary collateral artery, develops when native pulmonary circulation is underdeveloped
