= Atrial septostomy =

Surgical procedure on the heart

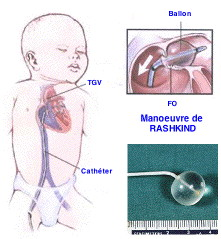
- Balloon atrial septostomy
- ICD-9-CM: 35.41

Atrial septostomy is a surgical procedure in which a small hole is created between the upper two chambers of the heart, the atria. This procedure is primarily used to palliate dextro-Transposition of the great arteries or d-TGA (often imprecisely called transposition of the great arteries), a life-threatening cyanotic congenital heart defect seen in infants. It is performed prior to an arterial switch operation. Atrial septostomy has also seen limited use as a surgical treatment for pulmonary hypertension. The first atrial septostomy (then less precisely called a septectomy) was developed by Vivien Thomas in a canine model and performed in humans by Alfred Blalock. The Rashkind balloon procedure, a common atrial septostomy technique, was developed in 1966 by American cardiologist William Rashkind at the Children's Hospital of Philadelphia.

There are two types of this procedure: balloon atrial septostomy (also called endovascular atrial septostomy, Rashkind atrial balloon septostomy, or simply Rashkind's procedure) and blade atrial septostomy (also called static balloon atrial septostomy).

== Indications ==
In a normal heart, oxygen-depleted blood ("blue") is pumped from the right side of the heart, through the pulmonary artery, to the lungs where it is oxygenated. This is the pulmonary circulation part of blood flow. The oxygen-rich ("red") blood then returns to the left heart, via the pulmonary veins, and is pumped through the aorta to the rest of the body, including the heart muscle itself. This is the systemic circulation part of blood flow, the other loop of an interconnected normal cardio-pulmonary system.

With d-TGA, certain major blood vessels are connected improperly, so oxygen-poor blood from the right heart is pumped immediately through the aorta and circulated to the body and the heart itself, bypassing the lungs altogether, while the left heart pumps oxygen-rich blood continuously back into the lungs through the pulmonary artery. This is a life-threatening situation due to the resultant low oxygen levels throughout the body. Atrial septostomy allows more of the oxygen-rich blood to circulate throughout the body. The procedure is a temporary measure meant to help the patient survive until further corrective surgery can be done.

In the separate case of pulmonary hypertension, abnormally high blood pressure in the blood vessels within and connected to the lungs puts stress on the right side of the heart, potentially leading to right heart failure. Atrial septostomy relieves some of this pressure, but at the cost of lower oxygen levels in the blood (hypoxia). As with d-TGA, this surgery is not a definitive solution to the underlying medical problem.

== Procedure ==
The majority of atrial septostomies are performed on infants with d-TGA or other cyanotic heart defects. In these cases, a balloon catheter is guided through a large vein into the right atrium, during cardiac catheterization. The catheter is threaded into the foramen ovale, a naturally existing hole between the atria that normally closes shortly after birth. The balloon at the end of the catheter is inflated so as to enlarge the foramen ovale enough that it will no longer become sealed. This allows more oxygenated blood to enter the right heart (especially in the case of d-TGA) where it can be pumped to the rest of the body. The balloon is deflated and the catheter is removed.

Sometimes the initial surgery is not entirely successful, or there are other factors that make a simple balloon atrial septostomy impossible, such as an older patient whose foramen ovale has already closed. This is when a blade atrial septostomy is performed. The details of the procedure are largely the same, except that a small blade on the end of the catheter is first used to create an opening between the right and left atria, before the insertion of the balloon.

The Rashkind balloon atrial septostomy is performed during cardiac catheterization (heart cath), in which a balloon catheter is used to enlarge a foramen ovale, patent foramen ovale (PFO), or atrial septal defect (ASD) in order to increase oxygen saturation in patients with cyanotic congenital heart defects (CHDs). It was developed in 1966 by American surgeons William Rashkind and William Miller at the Children's Hospital of Philadelphia.

William Rashkind was not a surgeon, but a pediatric cardiologist at the Children's Hospital of Philadelphia. He was one of the fathers of the field of interventional catheterization, and he developed not only this life-saving technique and device for neonates with transposition of the great arteries, but also devices to close atrial septal defects (ASDs) and persistent patent ductus arteriosus (PDA). He was the chief of the Division of Pediatric Cardiology at the Children's Hospital of Philadelphia until his death in 1986 from melanoma.

== Risks ==
As with any surgery, there are certain risks to atrial septostomy, including tearing of the cardiac tissue, arrhythmias, and rarely, death.
