= William Rashkind =

American cardiologist

William J. Rashkind
- Born: February 12, 1922
- Died: July 6, 1986 (aged 64)
- Education: University of Louisville School of Medicine
- Known for: Atrial septostomy
- Scientific career
- Fields: Pediatric cardiology
- Institutions: Children's Hospital of Philadelphia

William J. Rashkind (February 12, 1922 - July 6, 1986) was an American cardiologist. Rashkind worked at the Children's Hospital of Philadelphia. He is best known for his contributions to the treatment of congenital heart defects. He introduced the Rashkind balloon atrial septostomy to treat transposition of the great vessels.

== Biography ==
Rashkind was born in Paterson, New Jersey, and he attended the University of Louisville School of Medicine. He was a physician at the Children's Hospital of Philadelphia.

He is best known for the balloon septostomy procedure. In this technique, a cardiologist feeds a catheter into the heart of a patient with transposition of the great vessels. This catheter is advanced into the patient's right atrium, across a flap known as the patent foramen ovale (PFO) and into the patient's left atrium. There is a balloon on the end of the catheter. The balloon is inflated and then pulled back across the PFO, creating a hole in the heart through which oxygenated and deoxygenated blood can mix. Rashkind introduced his balloon septostomy procedure in 1966.

In May of that year, LIFE Magazine profiled Rashkind and described his procedure on a young boy named Bobby. The procedure had required only local anesthesia and the patient's color improved immediately thereafter. Describing the medical community's response to the Rashkind procedure, pediatric cardiologist Charles Mullins later said, "The initial response to this report varied between admiration and horror but, in either case, the procedure stirred the imagination of the 'invasive' cardiologists throughout the entire cardiology world and set the stage for all future intracardiac interventional procedures – the true beginning of pediatric and adult interventional cardiology."

Writing about Rashkind's balloon innovation, pediatric cardiologist Jacqueline Noonan said that Rashkind could legitimately be referred to as "the father of interventional pediatric cardiology." In 1986, Rashkind died of cancer at home in Marion, Pennsylvania.
