= FloWatch =

System to control medical implants

The FloWatch telemetric control system is a radio frequency system that is used to control medical implants. The radio signal not only sends commands to the implanted device but also the power required to adjust the device. At present the FloWatch technology is only used in the FloWatch-Pulmonary Artery Band.

The FloWatch Pulmonary Artery Band (FloWatch-PAB) is an implantable device that clips around the pulmonary artery in infants (from 2.5kg to about 6.5kg) requiring pulmonary artery banding. The FloWatch-PAB size can be adjusted by wireless remote control using the FloWatch Control Unit.

The band does not require a battery with power being provided through the (harmless) radio signal and the infant is free from any external support equipment and can return to their home if their condition allows.

Once in place, the FloWatch-PAB provides dynamic control of pulmonary artery blood flow. Conventional bands have a fixed size that often require re-operation to adjust (either a tied band or suturing the artery itself). This conventional banding, requires high levels of specific surgical experience and judgement. Adjustment of conventional bands requires re-operation with its related risks and costs.
