= Franz Freudenthal =

Bolivian physician

Franz P. Freudenthal
- Born: La Paz, Bolivia
- Occupation: Physician

Franz P. Freudenthal is a Bolivian physician who is known for several medical inventions, including a device that can cure heart ailments in children.

== Career ==
Franz Peter Freudenthal was born on September 13, 1963 in La Paz, Bolivia to Walter and Eva Maria Freudenthal, born Tichauer, descendents of German immigrants.

He was inspired to enter medicine by his grandmother, Dr. Ruth Tichauer, born Wreszinski, who was born in Königsberg in 1910 daughter Walter Wreszinski and died in La Paz in 1995. He used to go with her as a child on her medical visits in remote rural areas of Bolivia. She was a pioneer in family planning and in outpatient treatment of tuberculosis, and shared her philosophy of life with Freudenthal. He attended the Higher University of San Andrés in La Paz for his undergraduate studies, then did his internship at Children's Hospital of La Paz. He decided to specialize in pediatric cardiology. His wife, Alexandra Heath, is also a doctor. The couple received scholarships to take specialized training in Germany. He performed his first operation on a child in Germany in the 1990s.

Freudenthal became interested in medical devices. He was part of a team that in March 1998 reported encouraging results of tests on neonatal lambs for occlusion of patent ductus arteriosus with a double-helix device at RWTH Aachen University, Germany. The devices used memory-shaped double-cone stainless steel coils mounted on a titanium/nickel core wire. Freudenthal said that by the age of 25 he had treated more than 20 sheep with devices, and at the age of 29 had treated his first patient, a child that could not be cured in any other way.

After returning to Bolivia in 2003 the Freudenthals founded Kardiozentrum, a center for diagnosis and treatment of congenital heart disease. They also created PFM Bolivia, to develop and market medical devices. In 2014 Freudenthal was heading a team of 80 young innovators on a new project to develop a treatment for strokes. Freudenthal has taken out a number of patents including a left atrial appendage occlusion device, embolization device, tissue clip, tissue tack, snare mechanism for surgical retrieval and deployment device for cardiac surgery.

== Nit Occlud device ==
Freudenthal is known for his Nit Occlud device for treatment of an infant heart problem. The prototypes were first tested on sheep, and since then have been used successfully by Freudenthal on hundreds of children, and have been exported around the world. The device treats a congenital disorder in the heart known as a patent ductus arteriosus (PDA). This occurs when the ductus arteriosus blood vessel, which bypasses the lungs before a baby is born, fails to close up soon after birth. The affected infant suffers from labored breathing, failure to gain weight and other problems. The condition is much more common in Bolivia, where the country around La Paz is at an elevation of 4,000 metres (13,000 ft), than in other places.

The device is made from a single wire of nitinol, a flexible alloy of nickel and titanium. Nitinol was originally developed by the US military. The tiny Nit Occlud devices are small and intricate, and difficult to mass-produce. Instead they are woven by Aymara women in a "clean room". It takes about two hours to make each device. The device can be placed without an invasive operation, using cardiac catheterization. Nitinol is able to memorize its shape. The device is folded up and inserted into a catheter which is inserted into the groin and then run through blood vessels to the position in the heart where it is to be placed. The device is released and returns to its original shape, blocking the hole that caused the heart problem. By using a minimally invasive approach the technique addresses the concerns of some indigenous people of Bolivia that to manipulate the heart is to desecrate the soul. It takes about 30 minutes to place the device.

Technically, the Nit-Occlud ASD-R, is a double-umbrella, self-expanding, self-centering and premounted device knitted from a single nitinol wire without any soldering or protruding clamps or screws. The Nit-Occlud is similar to other self-expandable devices, which have provided excellent long-term clinical outcomes. The device has a unique shape that offers various advantages and a special snare-like release mechanism. It ranges in size from 8 to 30 millimetres (0.31 to 1.18 in) in stent diameter. The first human implantation was done at the La Paz Kardiocentrum by Alexandra Heath and coworkers. 53 implantations were made by this group from May 2007 to February 2011. Four attempts failed. Of the 53 implantations, complete closure occurred immediately in 71% of patients, and 100% after six months. Findings are generally very positive, although the erosion rate is not yet known.

In August 2014 it was announced that Freudenthal had won the "Innovators of America" award in the Science and Technology category for his occlusion device to cure congenital heart disease in children. The award is given by Innovative America, is sponsored by the CAF – Development Bank of Latin America and the Caribbean and the Spanish CAF Ezentis group, and was to be presented in Medellín, Colombia on 21 August 2014. As of 2014 the device had cured at least 50,000 children worldwide, and about 500 in Bolivia.

== Sources ==
- Alejandra Martins (2014-10-02). "The inventions of the Bolivian doctor who saved thousands of children". BBC Mundo.
- de los Reyes, Ignacio (2015-03-29). "The Bolivian women who knit parts for hearts". BBC News.
- "El médico boliviano Franz Freudenthal gana el premio "Innovadores de América"". Página Siete (in Spanish). 2014-08-01.
- "Franz Freudenthal patents". Fresh Patents.
- Gabriela Imaña (2014-11-16). "Los seis Innovadores de América revelan 10 claves para emprender". La Razo-n (in Spanish). La Paz.
- Granja, Miguel A.; Peirone, Alejandro; Barbosa, Jesus Damsky; Heath, Alexandra; Trentacoste, Luis (2014-11-25). "ADR-R PFM device". Interventions in Structural, Valvular and Congenital Heart Disease, Second Edition. CRC Press. ISBN 978-1-4822-1564-9.
- Ralph G Grabitz; Franz Freudenthal; Matthias Sigler; Trong-Phi Le; Christoph Boosfeld; Stefan Handt; Götz von Bernuth (March 1998). "Double-Helix Coil for Occlusion of Large Patent Ductus Arteriosus: Evaluation in a Chronic Lamb Model". Journal of the American College of Cardiology. 30 (3): 677–683. doi:10.1016/s0735-1097(98)00025-4. PMID 9502653.
