= Atrial switch =

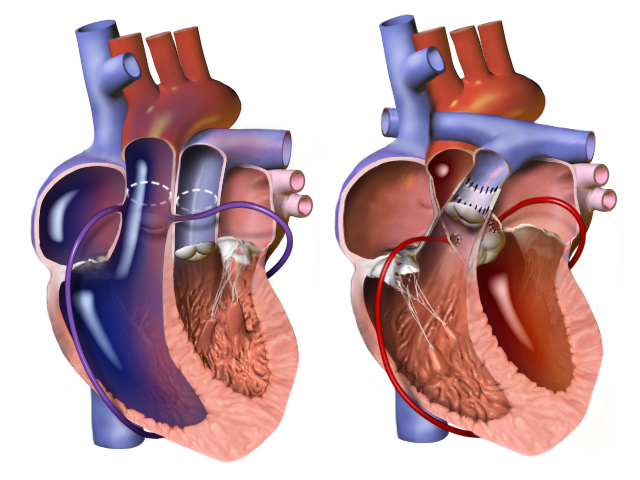
- Medical illustration of the Arterial Switch Operation
- Specialty: Cardiology

Atrial switch is a heart operation performed to treat dextro-Transposition of the great arteries. It involves the construction of an atrial baffle which redirects the blood coming into the atria to restore the connection between systemic and pulmonary circulation.

Two variants of the atrial switch operation developed – the Senning procedure (1950s) which uses the patient's own tissue (pericardium) to construct the baffle, and the Mustard procedure (1960s), which uses a synthetic material. It has largely been replaced by the arterial switch operation. The operation is more commonly performed in developing countries, where the condition frequently presents late.
