= Levo-Transposition of the great arteries =

- Other names: Congenitally corrected transposition of the great arteries (CC-TGA), L-transposition of the great arteries
- Specialty: Cardiac surgery, medical genetics

Levo-Transposition of the great arteries is an acyanotic congenital heart defect in which the primary arteries (the aorta and the pulmonary artery) are transposed, with the aorta anterior and to the left of the pulmonary artery; the morphological left and right ventricles with their corresponding atrioventricular valves are also transposed.

Use of the term "corrected" has been disputed by many due to the frequent occurrence of other abnormalities and or acquired disorders in L-TGA patients.

In segmental analysis, this condition is described as atrioventricular discordance (ventricular inversion) with ventriculoarterial discordance. L-TGA is often referred to simply as transposition of the great arteries (TGA); however, TGA is a more general term which may also refer to dextro-transposition of the great arteries (d-TGA).

== Signs and symptoms ==
Simple L-TGA does not produce any visually identifiable features at birth. However, systemic blood pressure then becomes much higher than pulmonary blood pressure. The morphological right ventricle, evolved to handle a low blood pressure, will over a period of years hypertrophy and may fail, because of the high pressure it is forced to work against. This may produce symptoms such as dyspnea or fatigue.

Complex L-TGA may produce immediate or more quickly-developed symptoms, depending on the nature, degree and number of accompanying defect(s). If a right-to-left or bidirectional shunt is present, the list of symptoms may include mild cyanosis.

== Pathogenesis ==
In a normal heart, oxygen-depleted ("deoxygenated") blood is pumped from the right atrium into the right ventricle, then through the pulmonary artery to the lungs where it is oxygenated. The oxygen-rich ("oxygenated") blood then returns, via the pulmonary veins, to the left atrium from which it is pumped into the left ventricle, then through the aorta to the rest of the body, including the heart muscle itself..

With L-TGA, deoxygenated blood is pumped from the right atrium into the morphological left ventricle (which lies on the right side of the heart), then through the pulmonary artery to the lungs. The oxygenated blood then returns, via the pulmonary veins, to the left atrium from which it is pumped into the morphological right ventricle, then through the aorta.

=== Variations and similar defects ===
L-TGA is often accompanied by other heart defects, the most common being ventricular septal defect (VSD), Tricuspid valve abnormalities including Ebstein's anomaly, Stenosis of valves or vessels, and conduction problems caused by displacement of the Atrioventricular node.

When no other heart defects are present it is called 'simple' L-TGA; when other defects are present it is called 'complex' L-TGA.

== Diagnosis ==
L-TGA can sometimes be diagnosed in utero with an ultrasound after 18 weeks gestation. However, many cases of simple L-TGA are "accidentally" diagnosed in adulthood, during diagnosis or treatment of other conditions.

== Treatment ==
Individuals with Simple L-TGA (with no other associated defects) may be asymptomatic and may not be diagnosed until late in life.

In a number of cases, the (technically challenging) "double switch operation" has been successfully performed to restore the normal blood flow through the ventricles.
