= Acyanotic heart defect =

Medical condition

- Other names: Non-cyanotic heart defect
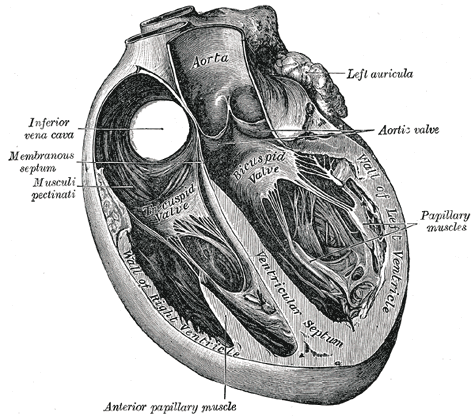
- Ventricular septum
- Specialty: Cardiology

An acyanotic heart defect, is a class of congenital heart defects. In these, blood is shunted (flows) from the left side of the heart to the right side of the heart, most often due to a structural defect (hole) in the interventricular septum. People often retain normal levels of oxyhemoglobin saturation in systemic circulation.

This term is outdated, because a person with an acyanotic heart defect may show cyanosis (turn blue due to insufficient oxygen in the blood).

== Signs and symptoms ==
Presentation is the following:

- Shortness of breath
- Congested cough
- Diaphoresis
- Fatigue
- Frequent respiratory infections
- Machine-like heart murmur
- Tachycardia
- Tachypnea
- Respiratory distress
- Mild cyanosis (in right sided heart failure)
- Poor growth and development (from increased energy spent on breathing)

=== Complications ===
This condition can cause congestive heart failure.

== Diagnosis ==
=== Types ===
Left to right shunting heart defects include:

- Ventricular septal defect (VSD) (30% of all congenital heart defects)
- Atrial septal defect (ASD)
- Atrioventricular septal defect (AVSD)
- Patent ductus arteriosus (PDA)

Others:

- levo-Transposition of the great arteries (l-TGA),

Acyanotic heart defects without shunting include:

- Pulmonary stenosis (a narrowing of the pulmonary valve)
- Aortic stenosis
- Coarctation of the aorta
