= Cyanotic heart defect =

Medical condition

- Other names: Right-to-left circulatory shunt
- Specialty: Cardiology

A cyanotic heart defect is any congenital heart defect (CHD) that occurs due to deoxygenated blood bypassing the lungs and entering the systemic circulation, or a mixture of oxygenated and unoxygenated blood entering the systemic circulation. It is caused by structural defects of the heart such as right-to-left or bidirectional shunting, malposition of the great arteries, or any condition which increases pulmonary vascular resistance. The result may be the development of collateral circulation.

== Types ==
- Tetralogy of Fallot (ToF)
- Total anomalous pulmonary venous connection
- Hypoplastic left heart syndrome (HLHS)
- Transposition of the great vessels (TGV)
- Persistent truncus arteriosus
- Tricuspid atresia
- Interrupted aortic arch
- Pulmonary atresia (PA)
- Pulmonic stenosis (critical)
- Eisenmenger syndrome (reversal of shunt due to pulmonary hypertension)

== Signs and symptoms ==
Presentation includes the following:

- Clubbing
- The patient assuming a crouching position
- Cyanosis - bluish face, particularly the lips; and bluish fingers and toes
- Crying
- Crabbiness/irritability
- Tachycardia
- Tachypnea
- A history of inadequate feeding
- Unusually large toe and fingernails
- Delayed development (both biological and physiological)

== Management ==
- Morphine during Tet spells to decrease associated infundibular spasm.
- Prophylactic: Propranolol
- Prostaglandin E (to keep the ductus arteriosus patent)
- Prophylactic antibiotic to prevent endocarditis
- Surgery: Variable. Superior Cavopulmonary Bypass (Bidirectional Glenn or Hemi-Fontan Procedure), Total Cavopulmonary Bypass (Fontan Completion Procedure). The purpose of these operations is to redirect the blood flow of the deoxygenated blood to the lungs by attaching the Vena Cava directly to the Pulmonary Artery causing the blood that flows into the lungs to be oxygenated before entering the chambers on the right side of the heart. Mathematical models are used to address the issue of pressure level alterations of circulation after the procedures. The pulmonary pressure resistance in the cavopulmonary connection is increased, and these models permit clear analyses of the pressure increase allowing doctors to avoid possible venous circulation congestion.
