= Velocity time integral =

Velocity Time Integral is a clinical Doppler ultrasound measurement of blood flow, equivalent to the area under the velocity time curve. The product of VTI (cm/stroke) and the cross sectional area of a valve (cm2) yields a stroke volume (cm3/stroke), which can be used to calculate cardiac output. VTI can be performed across the left ventricular outflow tract (LVOT), carotid artery, or other blood vessels. LVOT VTI can be incorporated into a POCUS examination to determine the etiology of shock or to predict fluid responsiveness. LVOT VTI can also be used to monitor cardiac output intra-operatively, or as method to precisely quantify cardiac output in patients with advanced heart failure.

== See also ==
- Cardiac output
