= William Thornton Mustard =

Canadian cardiac surgeon

- Born: August 8, 1914; Clinton, Ontario, Canada
- Died: December 11, 1987 (aged 73)
- Education: University of Toronto
- Occupations: Physician and cardiac surgeon
- Employer: Hospital for Sick Children
- Known for: Surgeon in the field of congenital heart defects

William Thornton Mustard OC MBE (August 8, 1914 – December 11, 1987) was a Canadian physician and cardiac surgeon. In 1949, he was one of the first to perform open-heart surgery using a mechanical heart pump and biological lung on a dog at the Banting Institute. He developed two operations named for him: the "Mustard operation" in orthopedics used to help hip use in people with polio and the "Mustard cardiovascular procedure" used to help correct heart problems in "blue babies," which has saved thousands of children worldwide. He was also the first to treat ALCAPA with a left carotid artery end to end anastamosis in 1953.

== Education and training ==
Born to Thornton and Pearl (Macdonald) Mustard in Clinton, Ontario, Mustard graduated from the University of Toronto Schools. In 1937, he received a medical degree from the University of Toronto. He spent the next year on an internship at Toronto General Hospital and the following year on an internship in surgery at the Hospital for Sick Children. He then took a fellowship at the New York Orthopedic Hospital, now Columbia University Irving Medical Center. In 1940, he returned to Toronto and spent six months training in general surgery, chest diseases, and neurosurgery.

== World War II service ==
In 1941, he enlisted in the Royal Canadian Army Medical Corps where he first served as a First Lieutenant rising to become a Major. During World War II, he pioneered an operation that helped keep a patient's limb with severe artery damage rather than amputating it. In 1944, he performed an operation on a leg of a soldier which would later be recognized with being made a Member of the Military Division of the Order of the British Empire. In 1941, he married Elise Howe. They had seven children. Their son Charles Mustard was convicted of the murder of Barbara Brodkin.

== Career at Sick Kids ==
After the war, he returned to Toronto and was chief resident at the Hospital for Sick Children for six months. He spent another year at the New York Orthopedic Hospital before being appointed surgeon at the Hospital for Sick Children in 1947. He spent a month training with Alfred Blalock in Baltimore. In 1957, he was appointed Chief of Cardiovascular Surgery and retired in 1976.

He died from a massive heart attack in 1987.

== Honours ==
In 1976, he was made an Officer of the Order of Canada "in recognition of his many achievements in the field of medicine, particularly as a cardiac surgeon of international repute". In 1975, he was awarded the Gairdner Foundation International Award. In 1995, he was inducted in the Canadian Medical Hall of Fame.
