= Mustard procedure =

- Specialty: Cardiothoracic surgery, pediatric surgery
- ICD-9-CM: 35.91

The Mustard procedure was developed in 1963 by Dr. William Mustard at the Hospital for Sick Children. It is similar to the previous atrial baffle used with a Senning procedure, the primary difference being that the Mustard uses a graft made of Dacron or pericardium, while the Senning uses native heart tissue.

The procedure was developed to treat transposition of the great vessels, eponymously known as blue baby syndrome. This is a condition in which the aorta and pulmonary artery are attached to the heart in an opposite order from what is usually present at birth, resulting in the aorta being the outflow tract for the right ventricle and the pulmonary artery serving as the outgoing path for blood from the left ventricle. The technique was adopted by other surgeons and became the standard operation for the dextro variant of transposition.

The procedure was developed with support from the Heart and Stroke Foundation of Canada.

In his autobiography, South African cardiac surgeon Christiaan Barnard claims to have been the first to perform the operation, with Mustard only following 'several years later'.

== Background ==
Prior to the development of the Senning procedure in the 1950s, blue baby syndrome from transposition was usually fatal. The defect causes blood from the lungs to flow back to the lungs and blood from the body to flow back to the body. As a result, the babies are blue at birth because of insufficient blood oxygen.

== Procedure ==
In a normal heart, the sequence of blood is from vena cava to right ventricle, then to the lungs and finally from lungs to the left ventricle to be circulated throughout the body. In patients with transposition, the order is from cava to left atrium and ventricle, then to the lungs and finally to the right side of the heart to be pumped out to systemic circulation.

The Mustard Procedure allows total correction of transposition of the great vessels. It creates a baffle to redirect deoxygenated caval blood to the left atrium, which then pumps blood to the left ventricle, which in turn delivers this deoxygenated blood to the lungs. The effect is that the left ventricle is a functional right, and the right ventricle a functional left.

== Superseded by Arterial Switch ==
The Mustard procedure was largely replaced in the late 1980s by the Jatene procedure (arterial switch), in which the native arteries were switched back to normal flow, so that the RV (right ventricle) would be connected to the pulmonary artery and the LV (left ventricle) would be connected to the aorta. This surgery had not been possible prior to 1975 because of difficulty with re-implanting coronary arteries which perfuse the actual heart muscle itself (myocardium), and even after it was first performed the excellent results from the Mustard operation meant that it was a long time before the Jatene procedure took over.

== Long-term survival ==
The Mustard procedure improved an 80% mortality rate in the first year of life to an 80% survival at age 20. Long-term follow-up studies now extend to more than 40 years post-operation and there are numerous patients thriving in their 50s. A Facebook group, Mustard or Senning Survivors, gathers well over a thousand global survivors in their 20s to 60's and even some survivors in their 70's into a single community, supporting adults born with TGA that have had a Mustard, Senning, Rastelli, Fontan repair or Nikaidoh heart procedure.

== See also ==
- Congenital heart disease
- Blalock–Hanlon procedure
