= Blalock–Hanlon procedure =

Surgical procedure involving the heart

- ICD-9-CM: 35.42

The Blalock–Hanlon procedure was created by Alfred Blalock and C. Rollins Hanlon. It was described in 1950. Alfred Blalock was an American surgeon most known for his work on the Blue Baby syndrome. C. Rollins Hanlon was also an American surgeon but was best known for his work in cardiology. The procedure that these two men created, known as the Blalock–Hanlon procedure, was a new concept termed atrial septectomy. This procedure had been experimented on the right atrium of dogs before Dr. Blalock and Dr. Hanlon had performed it on humans.

It involves the intentional creation of a septal defect in order to alter the flow of oxygenated blood. It was devised as a palliative correction for transposition of the great vessels.

The Blalock–Hanlon procedure was a cardiothoracic procedure created in the 1950s. The Blalock–Hanlon procedure was created to enhance intracardiac combinations. A majority of the surgeries using this procedure were performed in pediatrics on infants ranging from one day to five months of age. Of all the children who had this surgery, only one had to undergo a second operation to repair damage not fixed during the Blalock–Hanlon procedure. According to Behrendt, Orringer, and Stern, there were only ten early deaths out of the forty-eight children the operation was performed on. The deaths were of children that were less than one month old due to extensive measures taken during the operation.

The procedure also had a relatively high mortality rate of only twenty-one percent while it was performed however, because of the excessive mortality rate it is no longer used in today's medical society. This procedure was a combination of two circulations (Pulmonary and Systematic). Due to the intracardiac mixing, the procedure can cause postoperative arrhythmias, cerebral thrombosis, adhesions develops in the pericardial space, and many infants will face death between the septectomy.
