= Ventricular outflow tract obstruction =

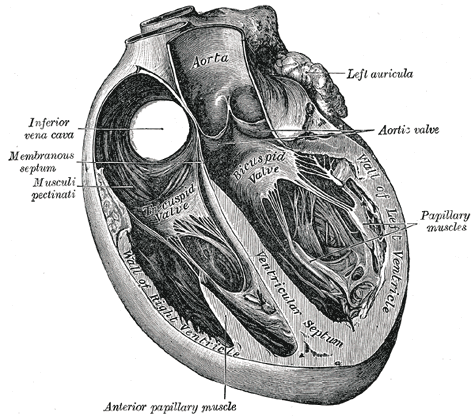
- Human heart
- Specialty: Cardiology
- Causes: Congenital or acquired
- Treatment: Surgery, medications, catheter based procedures (i.e. valvuloplasty)

A ventricular outflow tract obstruction is a heart condition in which either the right or left ventricular outflow tract is blocked or obstructed. These obstructions represent a spectrum of disorders. Majority of these cases are congenital, but some are acquired throughout life.

== Different types ==
=== Right ventricular outflow tract obstruction ===
A right ventricular outflow tract obstruction (RVOTO) may be due to a defect in the pulmonic valve, the supravalvar region, the infundibulum, or the pulmonary artery.

- Pulmonary atresia
- Pulmonary valve stenosis
- Hypoplastic right heart syndrome
- Tetralogy of Fallot

=== Left ventricular outflow tract obstruction ===
A left ventricular outflow tract obstruction (LVOTO) may be due to a defect in the aortic valve, or a defect located at the subvalvar or supravalvar level.

- Aortic valve stenosis
- Supravalvar aortic stenosis
- Coarctation of the aorta
- Hypoplastic left heart syndrome
- Hypertrophic cardiomyopathy

== Pathophysiology ==
A ventricular outflow tract obstruction means there is a limitation in the blood flow out of either the right or left ventricles of the heart, depending on where the obstruction is. This can lead to cardiac hypertrophy, dilatation of the heart, and ultimately heart failure in some cases. The right side of the heart is much smaller and weaker than the left side of the heart. It pumps de-oxygenated blood into the lungs. The left side of the heart is more muscular than the right side of the heart. It pumps oxygenated blood from the lungs into the aorta to perfuse the rest of the body. When the heart has to pump against increased resistance, or afterload, as in the case of a ventricular obstruction, it compensates by growing in size. This adaptation is beneficial to pump blood past the obstruction, but eventually this hypertrophy can lead to other problems including arrhythmias, ischemia, and heart failure.

=== Hypertrophic cardiomyopathy ===
In hypertrophic cardiomyopathy, there is disorganized production of cardiac myocytes leading to increased septal wall thickness and a pathologic motion of the mitral valve. The anterior mitral valve moves anteriorly during systole in these patients leading to dynamic LVOTO, and the increased mass of the septum leads to a physical narrowing for blood to pass through. Thus, both of these contribute to the left ventricular outflow tract obstruction seen in some cases of this disease. If severe enough, this condition requires prompt treatment, as these patients are at risk for lethal tachyarrythmias.

=== Aortic valve stenosis ===
Aortic valve stenosis is the most common cause of LVOTO. Aortic valve stenosis means the aortic valve has narrowed and is not opening freely. The aortic valve opens to allow blood to flow from the left ventricle to the aorta. Stenosis here leads to a narrowing of the passage for blood to flow out of the left ventricle, thus a LVOTO. More than 50% of patients with aortic valve stenosis have a congenital heart abnormality called a bicuspid aortic valve. The aortic valve is normally three leaflets but when it is bicuspid it is made of two. This increases the risk for aortic stenosis due to increased stress on the leaflets, calcium deposition, turbulent blood flow, and scarring. If the stenosis is severe enough, surgical intervention may be necessary.
