= Coronary reflex =

Reaction of blood vessels to stimuli

Coronary reflex is the change of coronary diameter in response to chemical, neurological or mechanical stimulation of the coronary arteries. The coronary reflexes are stimulated differently from the rest of the vascular system.

== Causes of coronary constriction ==
=== Chemical ===
- N-nitro L-arginine
- indomethacin
- glibenclamide
- tetraethylammonium chloride
- caffeine

=== Other ===
- Cold

== Causes of coronary dilation ==
Cocaine abuse frequently can cause a coronary spasm, resulting in a spontaneous myocardial infarction.

=== Chemical ===
- Versed (Midazolam): a coronary dilator. In midazolam's presence, dilation was unaffected by N-nitro L-arginine, indomethacin and glibenclamide.
- Tetraethylammonium chloride, an inhibitor of the BKCa K+ channel (a high conductance Ca2+-sensitive K+ channel), dose dependently attenuated the vasodilating effect of midazolam
- Estrogen has been shown to abolish abnormal cold-induced coronary constriction.
