= Pulmonary artery banding =

- Specialty: Cardiology

Pulmonary Artery Banding (PAB) was introduced by Muller and Dammann in 1951 as a surgical technique to reduce excessive pulmonary blood flow in infants suffering from congenital heart defects. PAB is a palliative operation as it does not correct the problems, but attempts to improve abnormal heart function, relieve symptoms and reduce high pressure in the lungs. The use of PAB has decreased over the years due to advancements in definitive surgical repairs, however PAB still has widespread clinical use. PAB is commonly used in patients when definitive surgical repair is not feasible.

== History ==
The technique was first described by Muller and Dammann at UCLA in 1951. In recent years, the use of this technique has declined as studies have indicated that early definitive repair is preferable to this form of palliation.

== Indications ==
The heart is separated into four chambers. Deoxygenated blood enters into the right chambers of the heart and continues through the pulmonary arteries to be oxygenated in the lungs. Oxygenated blood returns into the left side of the heart and out to the rest of the body, known as the systemic circulation. In congenital heart defects such as ventricular septal defects (VSD) and Atrioventricular septal defects (AVSD), there may be one or multiple holes in the walls separating adjacent chambers. This causes left-to-right shunting of blood as oxygenated blood can flow back to the right side of the heart, resulting in a mixture of oxygenated and deoxygenated blood. Increased amounts of blood on the right side of the heart cause an excess of blood flow into the lungs (pulmonary circulation) and increased pulmonary resistance due to the buildup of pressure.

== Surgical technique ==
The goal of PAB is to reduce pulmonary artery pressure and excess pulmonary blood flow. PAB involves the insertion of a band around the pulmonary artery to reduce blood flow into the lungs. A variety of banding materials are used; one commonly used material is polytetrafluoroethylene. The band is wrapped around the main pulmonary artery and fixed into place. Once inserted, the band is tightened, narrowing the diameter of the pulmonary artery to reduce blood flow to the lungs and reduce pulmonary artery pressure. PAB followed by later repair is a common surgical alternative when early definitive repair is high-risk.

== Limiting factors ==
One major difficulty with PAB is assessing the optimal tightness of band, as minimal changes to the diameter of the pulmonary artery can have drastic effects on resistance and blood flow. The pulmonary band can also migrate away from the original placement and lead to stenosis, in which the blood vessel becomes too narrow. There have also been reports of hardening of the vessels around the band due to a buildup of calcium deposits and scarring of the pulmonary artery wall beneath the band, which can also inhibit blood flow. Additional surgeries to adjust band tightness occur in up to one-third of patients. Erosion of the band through the pulmonary artery has been reported, which can lead to the formation of blood clots. This is more evident in bands made of umbilical tape or silk rather than Silastic or Teflon bands.

== Types ==
Due to the varying complications, different modifications of PAB have been developed to improve outcomes. Adjustable pulmonary artery banding has been available since 1972, allowing variable constriction. FloWatch (Leman Medical, Geneva, Switzerland: www.lemanmedical.com), an adjustable band, was created and has successfully been tested to overcome complications due to non-optimal sizing of the band. FloWatch is a wireless, battery-free, implantable device that allows the band size to be adjusted without the need for additional surgeries or other invasive procedures. The narrowing of the pulmonary artery can be controlled weeks or even months after the operation. Reports also show that the recovery period in patients that obtained the FloWatch device was faster and smoother in comparison to those that received the traditional PAB method. However FloWatch is only suitable for children with a body weight ranging from 3 kg to10kg.
