= Great vessels =

Vessels carrying blood to/from the heart

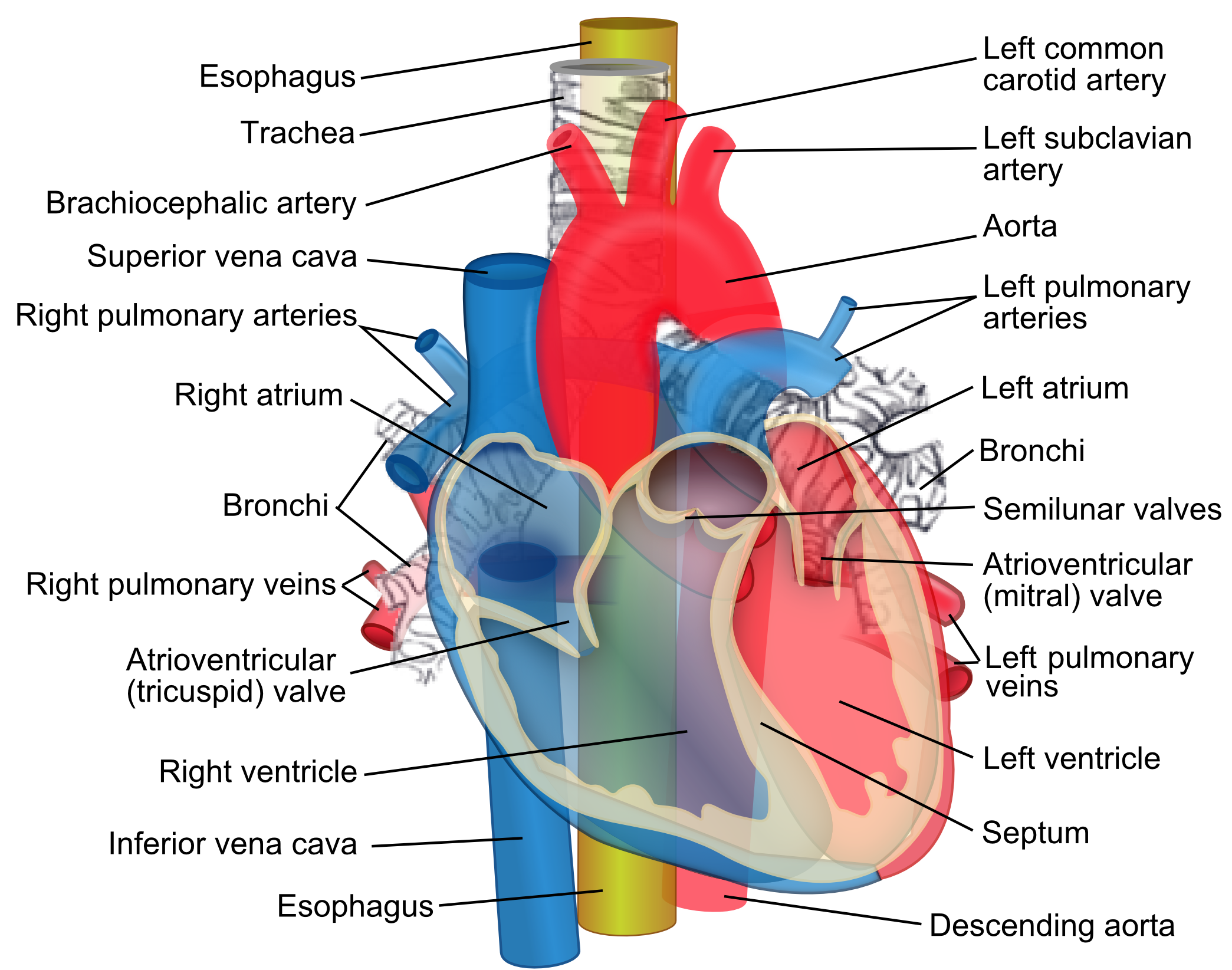
Anterior view of the heart, with all great vessels labeled.

Great vessels are the large vessels that bring blood to and from the heart. These are:

- Superior vena cava
- Inferior vena cava
- Pulmonary arteries
- Pulmonary veins
- Aorta

Transposition of the great vessels is a group of congenital heart defects involving an abnormal spatial arrangement of any of the great vessels.
