= Pulmonic stenosis =

Human health condition

- Other names: Pulmonary stenosis
- Specialty: Cardiology

Pulmonic stenosis, is a dynamic or fixed obstruction of flow from the right ventricle of the heart to the pulmonary artery. It is usually first diagnosed in childhood.

== Signs and symptoms ==
Some individuals with mild PS may not experience any symptoms. Mild PS is generally a benign condition that requires regular cardiac follow-up but no specific therapy.

However, there can be symptomatic cases. For example, a systolic ejection murmur, often accompanied by or without a systolic click, can be heard with a stethoscope. Patients may also feel tired easily (especially during physical activity), breathing difficulties (particularly during exertion), discomfort in the chest and lungs, and some individuals may also experience fainting episodes. In severe cases, patients may experience bluish or greyish skin due to low oxygen levels, especially in babies with critical PS.

== Cause ==
Pulmonic stenosis is usually due to isolated valvular obstruction (pulmonary valve stenosis), but it may be due to subvalvular or supravalvular obstruction, such as infundibular stenosis. It may occur in association with other congenital heart defects as part of more complicated syndromes (for example, tetralogy of Fallot).

== Pathophysiology ==
When pulmonic stenosis (PS) is present, resistance to blood flow causes right ventricular hypertrophy. If right ventricular failure develops, right atrial pressure will increase, and this may result in a persistent opening of the foramen ovale, shunting of unoxygenated blood from the right atrium into the left atrium, and systemic cyanosis. If pulmonary stenosis is severe, congestive heart failure occurs, and systemic venous engorgement will be noted. An associated defect such as a patent ductus arteriosus partially compensates for the obstruction by shunting blood from the left ventricle to the aorta then back to the pulmonary artery (as a result of the higher pressure in the left ventricle) and back into the lungs.

== Treatment ==
The treatment of choice is percutaneous balloon valvuloplasty and is done when a resting peak gradient is seen to be >60mm Hg or a mean >40mm Hg is observed.
