= Ventricular outflow tract =

Portion of heart ventricles through which blood passes to enter the great arteries

Heart

Details
- System: Circulatory

A ventricular outflow tract is a portion of either the left ventricle or right ventricle of the heart through which blood passes in order to enter the great arteries.

The right ventricular outflow tract (RVOT) is an infundibular extension of the ventricular cavity that connects to the pulmonary artery. The left ventricular outflow tract (LVOT), which connects to the aorta, is nearly indistinguishable from the rest of the ventricle. The outflow tract is derived from the secondary heart field, during cardiogenesis.

Both the left and right outflow tract have their own term. The right outflow tract is called "conus arteriosus" from the outside, and infundibulum from the inside. In the left ventricle the outflow tract is the "aortic vestibule". They both possess smooth walls, and are derived from the embryonic bulbus cordis

In both left and right ventricle there are specific structures separating the inflow and outflow of blood. In the right ventricle, the inflow and outflow is separated by the supraventricular crest. In the left ventricle, the anterior cusp of the mitral valve is responsible for separating the flow of blood.

A form of ventricular tachycardia originating from this anatomical structure is called RVOT tachycardia.

The RVOT is pathophysiologically affected in Brugada syndrome.

== See also ==
- Velocity time integral
