= Infundibulum (heart) =

Feature of chordate cardiac anatomy

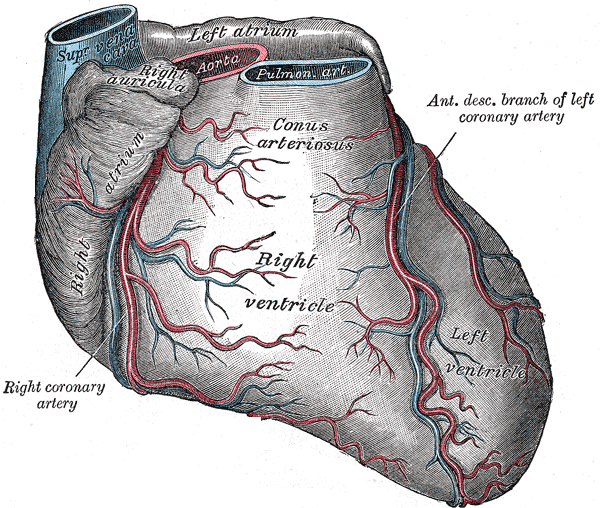
- Sternocostal surface of heart. (Infundibulum (Conus arteriosus) visible at top center.)

Details

Identifiers
- Latin: infundibulum
- TA98: A12.1.02.008
- TA2: 4041
- FMA: 7216

The infundibulum (also known as conus arteriosus) is a conical pouch formed from the upper and left angle of the right ventricle in the chordate heart, from which the pulmonary trunk arises. It develops from the bulbus cordis. Typically, the infundibulum refers to the corresponding internal structure, whereas the conus arteriosus refers to the external structure. Defects in infundibulum development can result in a heart condition known as tetralogy of Fallot.

A tendinous band extends upward from the right atrioventricular fibrous ring and connects the posterior surface of the infundibulum to the aorta. The infundibulum is the entrance from the right ventricle into the pulmonary artery and pulmonary trunk. The wall of the infundibulum is smooth.

== Additional images ==
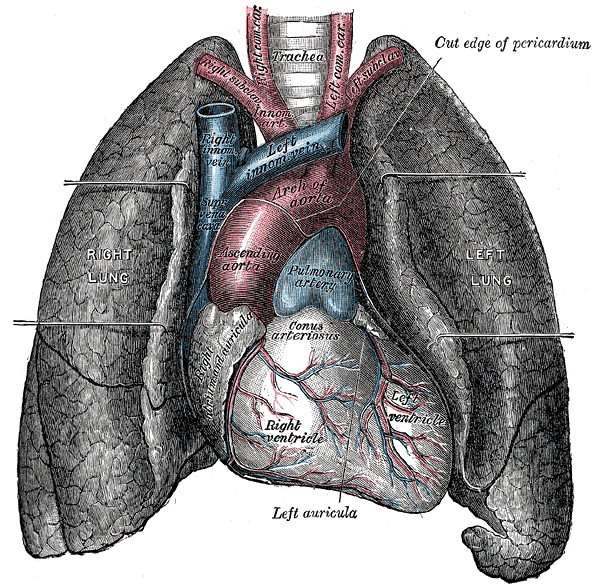
Front view of human heart and lungs.
