= List of diseases (V) =

This is a list of diseases starting with the letter "V".

== Va ==
=== Vac–Van ===
- Vaccinophobia
- VACTERL association
  - VACTERL association with hydrocephaly, X linked
- VACTERL hydrocephaly
- Vacuolar myopathy
- Vagabond's disease
- Vaginismus
- Vaginiosis (bacterial, cytologic)
- Vagneur–Triolle–Ripert syndrome
- Valinemia
- Valproic acid antenatal infection
- Valvular dysplasia of the child
- Van Allen–Myhre syndrome
- Van Bogaert–Hozay syndrome
- Van De Berghe–Dequeker syndrome
- Van Den Bosch syndrome
- Van Den Ende–Brunner syndrome
- Van der Woude syndrome
  - Van der Woude syndrome 2
- Van Goethem syndrome
- Van Maldergem–Wetzburger–Verloes syndrome
- Van Regemorter–Pierquin–Vamos syndrome
- Vancomycin-resistant Enterococcus (Vancomycin-resistant enterococcal bacteremia)

=== Var–Vat ===
- Varadi–Papp syndrome
- Varicella virus antenatal infection
- Varicella zoster
- Variegate porphyria
- Vas deferens, congenital bilateral aplasia of
- Vascular disruption sequence
- Vascular helix of umbilical cord
- Vascular malformations of the brain
- Vascular malposition
- Vascular purpura
- Vasculitis
- Vasculitis hypersensitivity
- Vasculitis, cutaneous necrotizing
- Vasopressin-resistant diabetes insipidus
- Vasovagal syncope
- Vasquez–Hurst–Sotos syndrome
- VATER association

== Ve ==
=== Vei–Ven ===
- Vein of Galen aneurysmal malformationss (VGAM)
- Vein of Galen aneurysmal dilatation (VGAD)
- Velocardiofacial syndrome
- Velofacioskeletal syndrome
- Velopharyngeal incompetence
- Venencie Powell Winkelmann syndrome
- Ventricular extrasystoles perodactyly Robin sequence
- Ventricular familial preexcitation syndrome
- Ventricular fibrillation, idiopathic
- Ventricular septal defect
- Ventriculo-arterial discordance, isolated
- Ventruto Digirolamo Festa syndrome

=== Ver–Ves ===
- Verloes–Bourguignon syndrome
- Verloes–David syndrome
- Verloes–Gillerot–Fryns syndrome
- Verloes–Van Maldergem–Marneffe syndrome
- Verloove–Vanhorick–Brubakk syndrome
- Verminiphobia
- Vernal keratoconjunctivitis
- Verrucous nevus acanthokeratolytic
- Verrucous nevus
- Vertebral body fusion overgrowth
- Vertebral fusion posterior lumbosacral blepharoptosis
- Vertical talus
- Vestibulocochlear dysfunction progressive familial

== Vi ==
=== Vil–Vis ===
- Viljoen–Kallis–Voges syndrome
- Viljoen–Smart syndrome
- Viljoen–Winship syndrome
- Vipoma
- Viral hemorrhagic fever
- Virilism
- Virilizing ovarian tumor
- Virus associated hemophagocytic syndrome
- Visceral myopathy familial external ophthalmoplegia
- Visceral steatosis
- Viscero-atrial heterotaxia
- Visna Maedi complex

=== Vit ===
- Vitamin A embryopathy
- Vitamin B_{6} deficiency
- Vitamin B_{12} deficiency
- Vitamin B_{12} responsive methylmalonic acidemia, cbl A
- Vitamin B_{12} responsive methylmalonicaciduria
- Vitamin D resistant rickets
- Vitamin E deficiency
  - Vitamin E familial isolated, deficiency of
- Vitiligo mental retardation facial dysmorphism uremia
- Vitiligo psychomotor retardation cleft palate facial dysmorphism
- Vitiligo
- Vitreoretinal degeneration
- Vitreoretinochoroidopathy dominant

== Vk–Vu ==
- VKH
- VLCAD deficiency
- Vocal cord dysfunction familial
- Von Gierke disease
- Von Hippel–Lindau disease
- Von Recklinghausen disease
- Von Voss–Cherstvoy syndrome
- Von Willebrand disease
- Vulvodynia
- Vulvovaginitis
