= Lutembacher's syndrome =

- This condition affects the atrium
- Specialty: Medical genetics

Lutembacher's syndrome is a very rare form of congenital heart disease that affects one of the chambers of the heart (commonly the atrium) as well as a valve (commonly the mitral valve). It is commonly known as both congenital atrial septal defect (ASD) and acquired mitral stenosis (MS). Congenital (at birth) atrial septal defect refers to a hole being in the septum or wall that separates the two atria; this condition is usually seen in fetuses and infants. Mitral stenosis refers to mitral valve leaflets (or valve flaps) sticking to each other making the opening for blood to pass from the atrium to the ventricles very small. With the valve being so small, blood has difficulty passing from the left atrium into the left ventricle. Septal defects that may occur with Lutembacher's syndrome include: Ostium primum atrial septal defect or ostium secundum which is more prevalent.

Lutembacher's syndrome affects females more often than males. It can affect children or adults; the person can either be born with the disorder or develop it later in life. The syndrome was first described by René Lutembacher (1884–1968) of Paris in 1916.

To correct Lutembacher's syndrome, surgery is often done. There are several types of surgeries depending on the cause of Lutembacher's syndrome (ASD Primum or ASD Ostium Secundum with Mitral Stenosis):

1. Suturing (stitching) or placing a patch of tissue (similar to skin grafting) over the hole to completely close the opening
2. Reconstructing of the mitral and tricuspid valve while patching any holes in the heart
3. Device closure of ASD (e.g. Amplatzer umbrella or CardioSEAL to seal the hole)
4. Percutaneous transcatheter therapy
5. Transcatheter therapy of balloon valvuloplasty to correct MS

== Symptoms and signs ==
As Lutembacher's syndrome is known for ASD and MS, most of the symptoms experienced will be associated with ASD and MS. For most people, they will remain asymptomatic (experience no symptoms) but when symptoms are shown, they are due mainly to ASD and will vary depending on the size of the hole in the atria. If the patient has a large ASD, pulmonary congestion (blood or fluid buildup in the lungs) will happen later but if the patient has a small ASD, symptoms will appear early in the disorder. In general, unless the ASD and mitral stenosis causing Lutembacher's syndrome is severe, symptoms may not appear until the second and third decade of the patient's life. As many of the patients are asymptomatic and symptoms may not appear until later in life, the duration or frequency of the symptoms varies. For symptoms such as palpitations, ventricular overload, heart failure, and pulmonary congestion, these symptoms may be sudden and not that frequent as they are very severe symptoms. For symptoms such as loud mitral S1, pulmonary S2, mid-diastolic murmur, fatigue, reduced exercise tolerance, weight gain, ankle edema, and right upper quadrant pain, and ascities, these symptoms may be less frequent and severe; their duration may be only a few seconds, minutes, or even months.

=== Major symptoms ===
Major symptoms of Lutembacher's syndrome as a result of ASD and MS can range from heart failure to pulmonary congestion.

- Right ventricular overload and Right-sided heart failure: Both are caused by a large ASD and MS (moderate to severe).
- Palpitations: This is caused by blood flowing from left atrium to the right atrium causing a higher left atrial pressure and leading to mitral stenosis. Both atria will be dilated (stretched or open) leading to future atrial arrhythmias or atrial fibrillation (Riaz).
- Pulmonary congestion: When blood or fluid pools within the lungs; this is usually a symptom of mitral stenosis and a small ASD.
- Loud mitral S1 and wide fixed split of pulmonary S2: The loud sound of the mitral S1 and the wide fixed split of pulmonary S2 is a symptoms of mitral stenosis. The sounds often are caused by a reduced pressure gradient in the mitral area that was caused from decompression of the left atrium from the ASD and a displacement (moving from normal position) of the left ventricular lower portion of the heart to the a large right ventricle. The second heart sound (S2) split is caused by the increase right heart blood flow through the ASD causing a late closing of the pulmonary component of the S2 as well as decreased left ventricular and aortic blood flow.
- III/IV mid diastolic murmur, early systolic murmur: This heart murmur is caused by an increase blood flow through the tricuspid valve due to ASD; it is heard best in the left lower sternal area or the bottom of the heart (apex).

=== Minor symptoms ===
- Fatigue: symptoms is caused by decreased systemic (oxygenated blood to the rest of the body) flow. When the patient has MS and the blood flows from the left atrium to the right atrium causes the forward blood flow into the left ventricle to reduce leading to a reduction of systemic blood flow; this causes tiredness.
- Reduced exercise tolerance: symptoms also caused by decreased systemic (oxygenated blood to the rest of the body) flow. Just as with fatigue, when the patient has MS and the blood flows from the left atrium to the right atrium, the forward blood flow into the left ventricle is reduced leading to a reduction of systemic blood flow; this causes tiredness and hence a reduced exercise tolerance.
- Weight gain: this is commonly found in patients with large ASD and can be a symptom of developing right-sided heart failure. As there is a chronically increased left-to-right blood flow through the atria, this will lead in the future to right-sided heart failure.
- Ankle edema: This is also caused by a large ASD and has the same symptoms and causes as seen in weight gain and right upper quadrant pain. As blood flow is not happening correctly and the heart is pumping under strain, pooling of blood and fluid will happen in the ankles.
- Right upper quadrant pain: Also caused by large ASD; has same symptoms and underlying causes as weight gain and ankle edema.
- Ascites: Ascite is known as abnormal buildup of fluid in spaces between abdomen lining and abdominal organs. Same symptoms and causes as weight, gain, ankle edema, and right upper quadrant pain.

=== Less common symptoms ===
- Paroxysmal nocturnal dyspnea, orthopnea, and hemoptysis (sign of pulmonary venous congestion): this symptoms are less frequent in Lutembacher's syndrome and are more associated with MS and small ASD or patients who develop reverse Lutembacher's syndrome. This symptom is caused by mitral stenosis.

=== Related disorders ===
- Eisenmenger syndrome
- Ventricular Septal Defect
- Mitral regurgitation
- Ebstein disease

== Causes ==
Lutembacher is caused indirectly by heart damage or disorders. Lutembacher's syndrome is caused by either birth defects where the heart fails to close all holes in the walls between the atria or from an episode of rheumatic fever where damage is done to the heart valves such as the mitral valve and resultant in an opening of heart wall between atria. With Lutembacher's syndrome, a fetus or infant is usually seen to have a hole in their heart wall (interatrial) separating their right and left atria. Normally during fetal development, blood bypasses the lungs and is oxygenated from the placenta. Blood passes from the umbilical cord and flows into the left atrium through an opening called the foramen ovale; the foramen ovale is a hole between the two atria. Once a baby is born and the lungs begin to fill with air and the blood flow of the heart changes, a tissue flap (somewhat like a trap door) called the septum primum closes the foramen ovale or hole between the two atria and becomes part of the atrial wall. The failure of the hole between the two atria to close after birth leads to a disorder called ASD primum. The most common problems with an opening found in the heart with Lutembacher's syndrome is Ostium Secundum. Ostium Secundum is a hole that is found within the flap of tissue (septum primum) that will eventually close the hole between the two atria after birth. With either type of ASD, ASD will usually cause the blood flow from the right atrium to skip going to the right ventricle and instead flow to the left atrium. If mitral stenosis (the hardening of flap of tissue known as a valve which opens and closes between the left atrium and ventricle to control blood flow) is also present, blood will flow into the right atrium through the hole between the atria wall instead of flowing into the left ventricle and systemic circulation. Eventually this leads to other problems such as the right ventricle failing and a reduced blood flow to the left ventricle.

In addition to the ASD, MS can either be acquired (present either from an episode of rheumatic fever or the mother has or had rheumatic fever during the pregnancy) or congenital (the child being born with the disorder). With the combination of both ASD and MS, the heart can be under severe strain as it tries to move blood throughout the heart and lungs.

== Mechanism ==
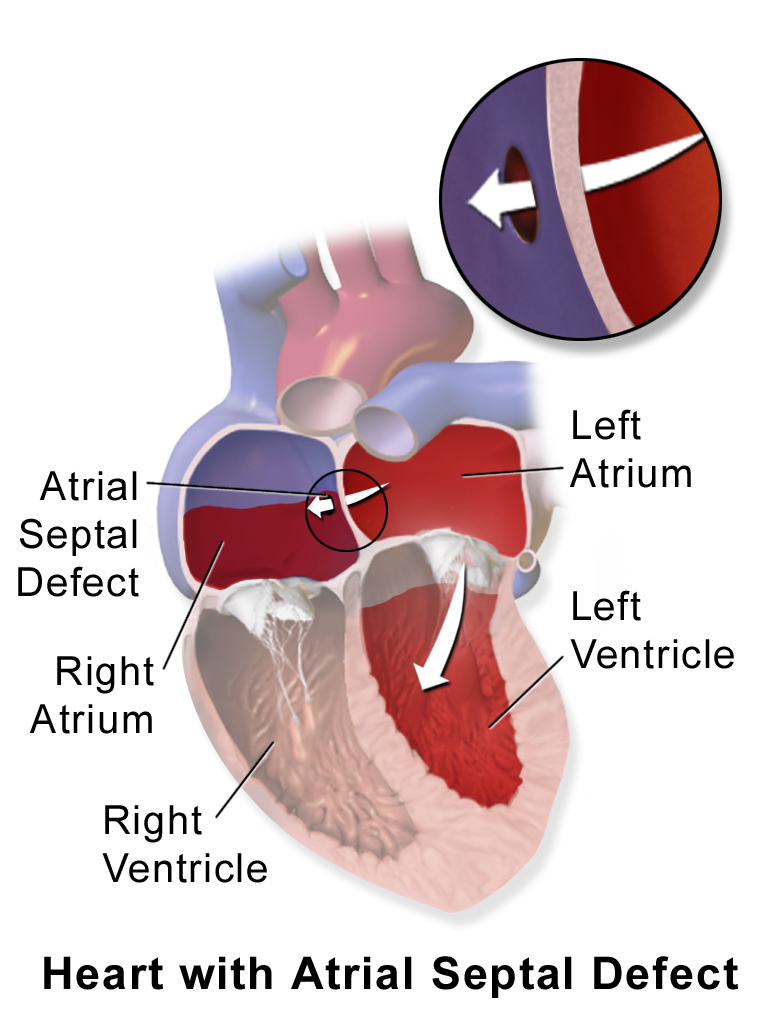
Atrial Septal Defect (ASD)

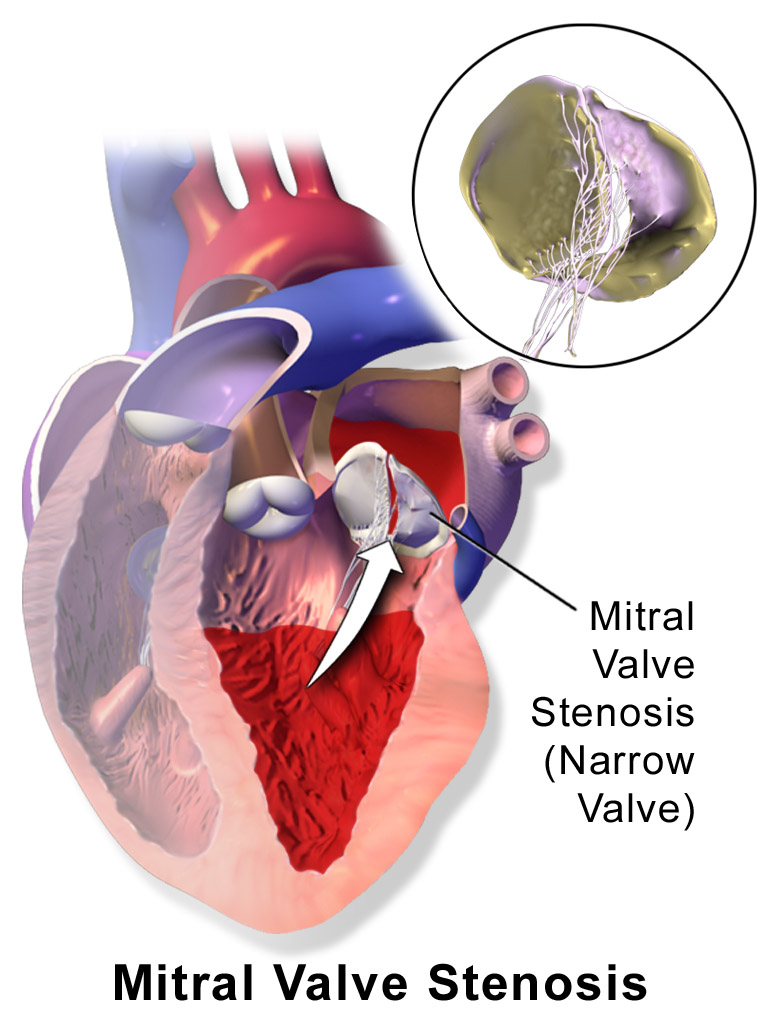
Mitral Valve Stenosis (MS)

There is no exact mechanism for Lutembacher's syndrome but instead a combination of disorders as the result of Atrial septal defect (ASD) and/or Mitral valve stenosis.It is thought ASD is caused by the failure to close the hole (foramen ovale) between the right and left atrium normally found within the heart during fetal development; the creation of a hole between the atrium may also be acquired. There are two types of ASD: Ostium secundum and ASD Primum.

=== Atrial Septal Defect Primum ===
The failure of the hole between the right and left atrium to close shortly after birth is the cause behind ASD primum. During fetal development blood will pass from the umbilical cord and flow into the left atrium through a hole between the two atria. Once a baby is born and the lungs begin to fill with air, the blood flow of the heart changes; a tissue flap (septum primum) normally closes the hole (foramen ovale) between the two atria and becomes part of the atrial wall. During ASD primum, after birth the hole is not completely closed allowing blood to flow into the right atria from the left atria. Then blood pass to right ventricle this will increase pulmonary artery pressure Due to the incorrect blood flow, symptoms such as fatigue (from decreased systemic blood flow), palpitations (from blood flowing from left atria to right atria), weight gain, edema, right upper chest pain (all caused from the left to right atria blood flow), and paroxysmal nocturnal dyspnea (shortness of breath during sleep), orthopnea (difficulty in breathing while lying down), and hemoptysis or coughing up blood (all caused by small ASD that cause blood flow from left to right atria).

=== Atrial Septal Defect Ostium secundum ===
During the more common form of Lutembacher's syndrome, ASD Ostium secundum, a hole will form in the flap of tissue (septum primum) that should close between the two atria after birth. With the onset of a hole created in the tissue flap that closes the larger hole between the left and right atrium, blood can again flow from the left atrium to the right. Ostium secundum causes many of the same symptoms seen in ASD primum. With either type of ASD, blood will flow from the right atrium skipping the right ventricle (or very little flowing into the ventricle) and instead flow to the left atrium introducing the possibility of blood lacking oxygen to go the rest of the body. Sometimes, the direction of blood flow is largely determined by the left and right ventricle ability to squeeze (contract) and relax (compliance).

Apart from congenital or birth defects causing ASD, ASD is thought to be also acquired. During percutaneous interventional procedures such as mitral valvuloplasty (a surgical process done to repair a mitral valve), 11-12% of individuals will develop ASD allowing blood to flow from the left atrium to the right.

=== Mitral Valve Stenosis ===
The second cause of Lutembacher's syndrome is mitral stenosis (MS). MS can be caused by birth defects, rheumatic fever, or just stress to the heart due to ASD; because MS can be caused by several things, there is no exact mechanism but many mechanisms or causes. If mitral valve stenosis is a result of birth defects during development stemming from rheumatic fever, several things may occur in the heart. Rheumatic fever causes the immune system to attack its own protein tissues leading to lesions forming on the mitral valve flaps. As the flaps heals over time, the flaps lose their filmy and floppiness resulting in solid, stiff flaps. The loss of proper flappy mitral valves makes it harder for the valves to open and allow blood to flow through. As a result of blood flow being stopped or slowed by the faulty valve, pressure begins to build in the heart. It was once thought an ASD is not already present, could form because of MS, but it is now thought the ASD is either a birth defect or acquired from surgical procedures.

Overall, Lutembacher's syndrome has no certain mechanism but a combination as the result of ASD and MS.

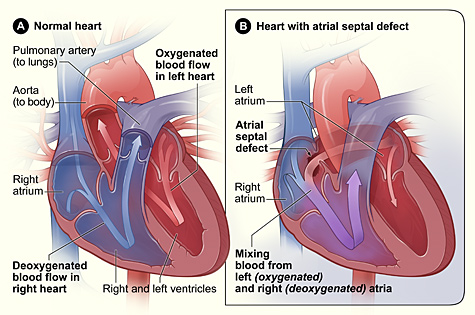

== Diagnosis ==
Lutembacher's syndrome is diagnosis primarily by physical examinations for heart sounds, electrocardiograms, chest radiogram, transthoracic or transesophageal echocardiography, color flow mapping, and Doppler imaging. Use of the various test can help to differentiate other possible conditions such as mitral regurgitation, Ebstein disease, ventricular septal defect (VSD).

=== Physical examinations ===
A physical examination will be done to check for abnormal heart sounds, condition of heart, blood pressure, lungs, palpitations, edema, weight gain, ascites, or any other abnormal symptoms. Blood may also be drawn to help determine the cause of fatigue, determination of ascites, other health problems that maybe closely related to cause the symptoms such as kidney, liver, immune (signs of rheumatic fever), abnormal glucose levels.

=== Electrocardiograms ===
Electrocardiogram (ECG) is used for determination of the location, size, direction of blood flow through the atrial hole, hemodynamic of the right ventricle (blood circulation), tricuspid valve, and functioning of left ventricle. The ECG can also be used to determine the rhythm of the heart to determine if there is an indication of sinus rhythm or atrial fibrillation. In the ECG, the p wave morphology will be study for any abnormalities. If during the ECG, the P-wave (atrial depolarization) is tall, broad, or split waves in lead II and accompanied with a deep negative force in V1, this would be considered to be abnormal; only one wave should be associated with the P-wave. Additionally, in an ECG the QRS morphology and axis will be examined for any abnormalities. If the ECG shows a right axis deviation which is abnormal or a right bundle-branch block (this would mean there was no signal going through the atrium to instruct the ventricle to contract or squeeze blood out of the ventricle).

=== Chest radiogram ===
A chest radiogram can be given to a patient to determine:

- Pulmonary plethora: the test will help to determine if there is a left-to-right shunt meaning the blood is flowing from the left atrium to the right through a hole between the two atria.
- Mild left atrial enlargement: the test will help to determine if the left atrium is enlarged due to alternate blood flows
- Right ventricular enlargement: the test will help to determine if the ventricle is enlarged due to a surge of blood above normal or if the ventricle is having to work harder than normal to pump blood out of the ventricle.
- Pulmonary artery enlargement: the test will help to determine if there is a large volume of blood in the pulmonary veins and arteries than normal
- Mitral Valve calcification late in life: the test will help to determine if the mitral valve or flaps are becoming hardened and losing their floppiness.
- pulmonary vascular congestion, marked left atrial enlargement: the test will help to determine if there is a sign of MS and small ASD and how severe both are.

=== Transthoracic or Transesophageal echocardiography ===
Transthoracic or Transesophageal echocardiography two dimensional images that can be made of the heart. They can be used to determine the stages of Lutembacher's syndrome. They are used to determine:

- Large left atrium: the test can help to determine if the left atrium is enlarged to a large blood flow then unusually
- Large right atrium and ventricle: the test will help to determine if the right atrium and ventricle are enlarged due to a greater blood flow
- ASD: the test will help to determine if there is a hole between the two atria and if blood is flowing through both
- Stenotic mital valve: the test will help to determine if the blood flow through the mitral valve is normal or if the mitral valve is stiff, has a reduced opening, and constricting blood flow through it.

=== Color flow mapping and Doppler imaging ===
A color flow and doppler imaging is used to help confirm the presence as well as evaluate the severity of ASD and MS.

=== Chest X-ray ===
A chest x-ray will be given to determine the size of the heart and the blood vessels supplying blood to the lungs.

=== Cardiac catheterization ===
Cardiac catheterization is done to confirm a diagnosis; it is not routinely done prior. It can also be used to evaluate the severity of ASD and measure the mitral valve area. To determine the presence ASD, a catheter is passed through the suspected hole between the atrium into the left atrium.

== Treatments ==
To treat Lutembacher's syndrome, the underlying causes of the disorder must first be treated: mitral stenosis and atrial septal defect. Lutembacher's syndrome is usually treated surgically with treatments such as:

- percutaneous transcatheter therapy for MS
- Device closure of ASD

Percutaneous transcatheter treatment for the MS can include transcatheter therapies of such as balloon valvuloplasty.

=== Percutaneous transcatheter therapy ===
Percutaneous transcatheter therapy is used to repair the mitral valve and sometimes the septum. In percutaneous balloon mitral valvuloplasty, using a catheter, a ballon such as the Inoue ballon is placed into blood vessels in the groin area and the balloon guided to the heart. If a hole is not already present, a small hole may need to be inserted the atria and inserted into the mitral valve through the left atrium; the balloon is then inflated. The balloon inside the mitral valve will be inflated and deflated several times to wide the valve opening until the opening is satisfactory; the balloon will then be deflated and removed.

The advantage to using percutaneous procedures instead of open-heart surgery is not needing general anesthesia, blood transfusions, and the recovery time is quicker. The drawback to this procedure is the lack of repeating and transseptal procedures if they are needed later. Also if the patient later develops a relapse of MS, surgery will need to be performed where using more evasive techniques. Additionally, if a hole is needed to be inserted into the atria to obtain access to the mitral valve, there is a risk of developing ASD secondarily.

==== Side effects ====
Possible side effects from this non-invasive procedure could be:

- fever
- Chest pain
- Shortness of breath
- Unusual swelling or weight gain
- Swelling, bleeding, change in skin color at site of initial catheterization in groin, or pain in the groin.

If any of the above symptoms occur, it is important to contact your doctor to prevent another lapse of mitral stenosis. To ensure good health, routine doctors visits, diet, weight loss, doctor-approved exercise, and use of antibiotics in dental and other procedures are recommended.

=== Device closure ===
To treat ASD a device closure can be used. In fact an ASD closure is often recommended for certain cases such as with a patient who has significant left-to-right shunt with a pulmonary and/or systemic flow fraction of Qp/Qs >1.5. It is best to perform this procedure/surgery between the ages of 2–4 years. The closure is done by two methods: interventionally or surgically.

==== Interventionally ====
This procedure is done by placing a device such as Amplatzer "umbrella", CardioSEAL similar to percutaneous transcatheter therapy. A catheter is inserted in the vessels and threaded to the heart and inserted into the ASD closing the defect. Other closure device that have been used is the GORE HELEX Septal Occluder. After the device has been inserted and covers the defect, over time tissue will grow over the implant device to make it become part of the heart. Anticoagulant medication will be given to the patient for the first six months following the surgery: aspirin, clopidogrel or warfarin (Coumadin).

==== Surgically ====
This procedure is done through open heart surgery (sternotomy or thoracotomy) using an ECC where the heart is stopped to allow a system of special cannulas to be placed. The hole is closed by a direct suture (sewing) if the hole is small enough or if the hole is larger, suturing (sewing) a small patch of pericardium (heart tissue or skin) or fabric to close the hole.

To increase quality life following ASD procedures/surgeries, patients should have a physical exam and ECG every 3, 6, and 12 months with their cardiologist. For many patients with secundum ASD closure repair, they can return to their normal activities unless their procedure was heart catheterization which in this case they should rest for a few days. All patients should remain on blood thinner medication for at least 6 months and up to a year unless the patient had a stroke in which they would always be on blood thinners. Patients with coronary artery disease or pulmonary hypertension will take additional medicines described by their physician. For patients who had heart surgery to repair the defect or received a transcatheter closure device, they will need to take some form of antibiotics to prevent infections such as endocarditis for at least 6 months following the procedure.

Success with ASD closure is very high, 96% for percutaneous procedures and 100% of ASD surgeries as found by one research group. No patient was found to have died from either interventional or surgical treatments and only 7.2% of patients who received a device and 24.0% of patients who had surgery had complications. The hospital stay for each group also varied, the surgical group was 3.4 ± 1.2 days and device group 1.0 ± 0.3 days. As seen by this study, prognosis was good and quality of life could be excellent.

===== Side effects =====
Side effects with interventional device closure have not been extensively supported as yet.

Possible side effects from the ASD device closure procedure could be:

- fever
- Chest pain
- Swelling
- Swelling, bleeding, change in skin color at site of initial catheterization in groin, or pain in the groin

With surgically closure, the normal risk of infection, fevers, and blood clots are among the risks. If any signs of infection such as swelling, pain, or fever are present, the patient should seek medical attention. Patients who have ASD repaired later in life are also at a higher risk of developing atrial fibrillation especially if the device is not stable.

== Recent research ==
Through examining the benefits of using percutaneous treatment as an alternative to surgically means to correct MS and ASD, it was found that combined percutaneous treatment (including balloon valvuloplasty for MS and Amplatzer septal occluder for closure of the ASD) has improved the patient's planimetric mitral valve area to 2.1 cm (as compared to the previous 1.5 cm), maximum diastolic gradient to 9 mmHg (compared to previous 17 mmHg), and mean diastolic gradient to 4 mmHg (as compared to previous 9 mmHg).

In another study, surgeons developed a way to use percanteous therapy in difficult situations. In this study they developed a technique to use the Inoue balloon in valvuloplasty but to insert a wire into the left atrium prior to inserting the balloon. This enabled the surgeons to be more precise in treating the mitral valve and not have the balloon to slip out of place; the wire served as a guide to inserting the balloon.

Other Percutaneous procedures beside balloon valvuloplasty for MS have been looked into. Percutaneous Leaflet Plication (Edge-to-Edge Leaflet Repair) is being explored as a way to increase the opening of the mitral valve by clamping down mitral leaflets. The clamps are delivered to the mitral through a catheter as with the balloon, and then clamped onto the mitral valve. Of the patients that received this treatment, 74% patients achieved surgical success, and at 1-year, 68% were saved from dying, 90% from having to have surgery or dying from the lack thereof, a 76.3% prognosis at three years.

Given the many possible treatments that are to come, future research is continuing to find better methods of treating Lutembacher patients non-invasively as with percutaneous therapy. Without successfully treating Lutembacher's more serious complications can occur such as heart failure or even disorders such as Eisenmenger syndrome.
