= Atrioventricular septum =

Wall of the heart chambers

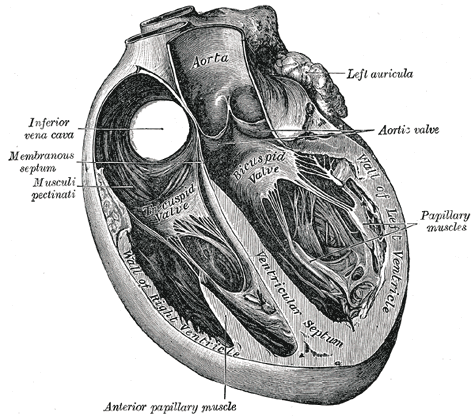
- Interior of heart. (AV septum not labeled, but region is visible.)

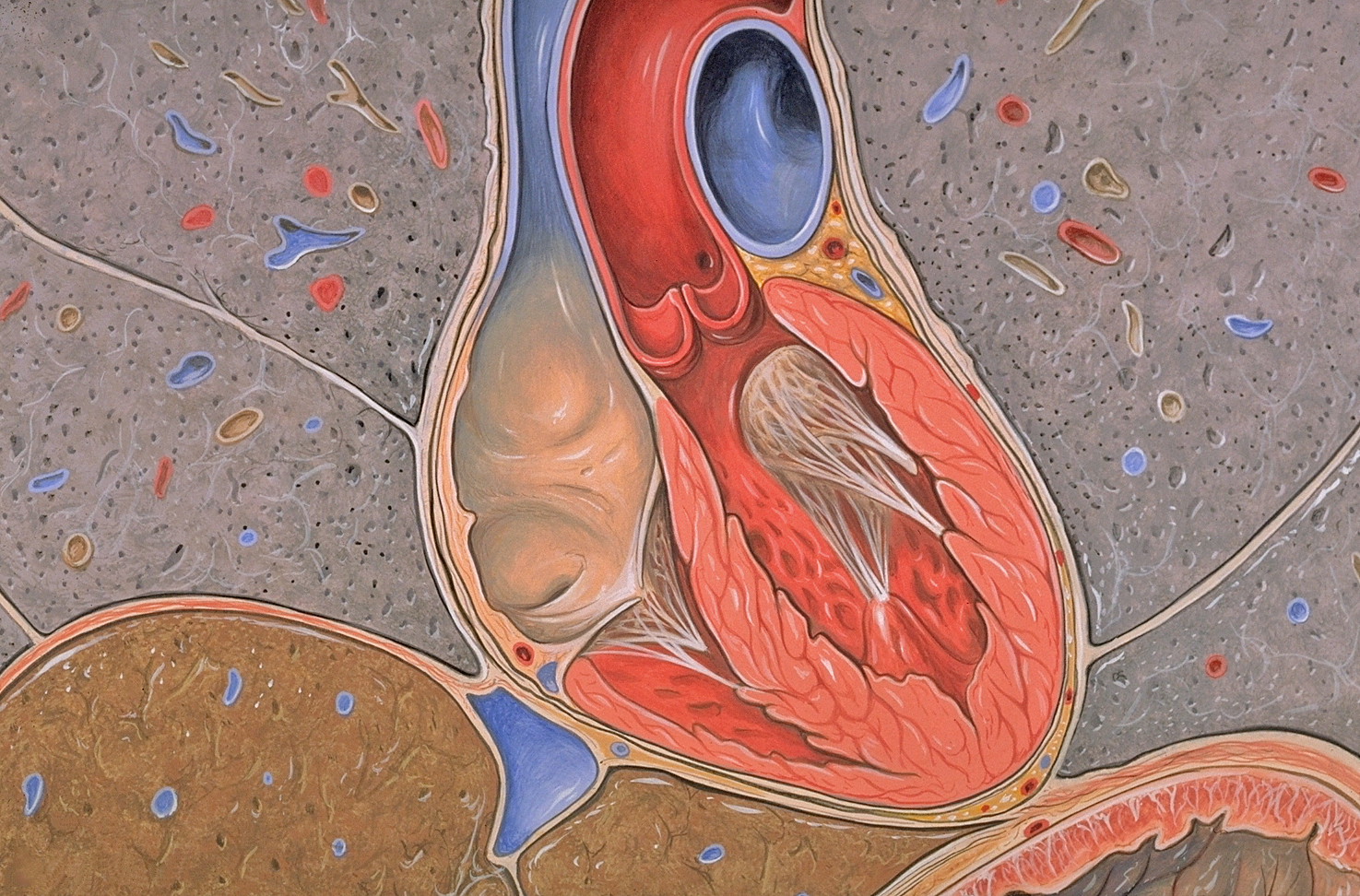
- Coronal cross section of heart. Note how the septum between the RA and LV becomes membranous.

Details

Identifiers
- Latin: septum atrioventriculare
- TA98: A12.1.00.016
- TA2: 3969
- FMA: 7136

The atrioventricular septum is a septum of the heart between the right atrium (RA) and the left ventricle (LV).

Although the name "atrioventricular septum" implies any septum between an atrium and a ventricle, in practice the divisions from RA to RV and from LA to LV are mediated by valves, not by septa. Also, there is usually no communication between the LA and the RV.

== Structure ==
It has a membranous and muscular part.

When considering only the membranous septum, it is also known as the "atrioventricular component of the membranous septum".

=== Development ===
It is formed by the union of the dorsal AV cushion and ventral AV cushion. This septum divides the atrioventricular canal.

== Clinical relevance ==
In some cases, defects can be identified with an echocardiogram.

Incomplete formation of the endocardial cushions can lead to atrioventricular septal defects, such as an ostium primum defect.
