= Ostium primum atrial septal defect =

- Other names: Endocardial cushion defect
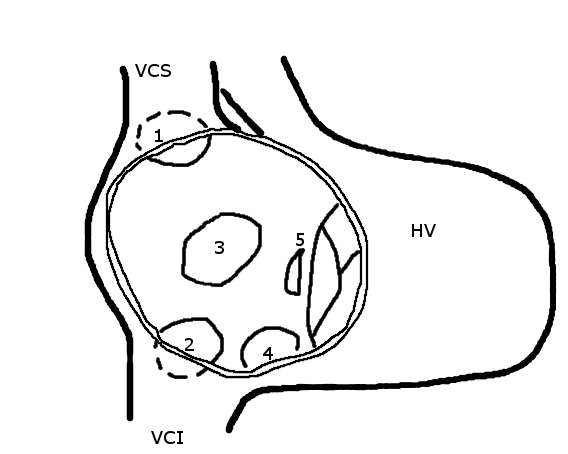
- Schemating drawing showing the location of different types of ASD, the view is into an opened right atrium. HV: right ventricle; VCS: superior caval vein; VCI: inferior caval vein; 1: upper sinus venosus defect; 2: lower sinus venosus defect; 3: secundum defect; 4: defect involving coronary sinus; 5; primum defect.
- Specialty: Medical genetics

The ostium primum atrial septal defect is a defect in the atrial septum at the level of the tricuspid and mitral valves. This is sometimes known as an endocardial cushion defect because it often involves the endocardial cushion, which is the portion of the heart where the atrial septum meets the ventricular septum and the mitral valve meets the tricuspid valve.

Endocardial cushion defects are associated with abnormalities of the atrioventricular valves (the mitral valve and the tricuspid valve). These include the cleft mitral valve, and the single atrioventricular valve (a single large, deformed valve that flows into both the right ventricle and the left ventricle).

Endocardial cushion defects are the most common congenital heart defect that is associated with Down syndrome.

== Signs and symptoms ==
On ECG a left axis deviation is generally found in ostium primum ASD, but an RSR pattern (M pattern) in V1 is characteristic. Fixed splitting of the second heart sound (S2) occurs because of equal filling of the left and right atria during all phases of the respiratory cycle.

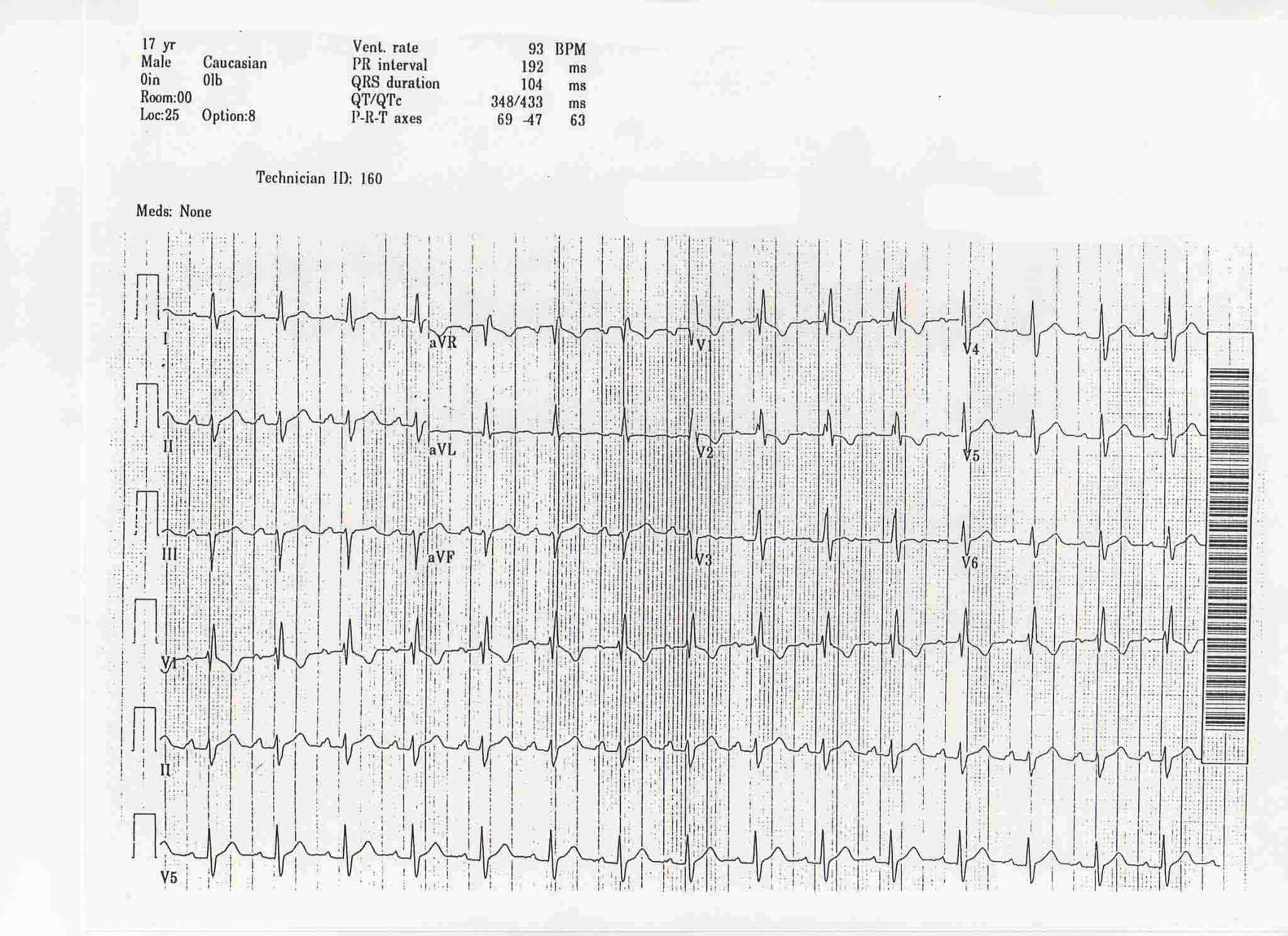
ECG of a patient with Ostium primum ASD

Patients with atrial Septal Defects may have atrial fibrillation, atrial tachycardia, or atrial flutter, but these abnormal heart rhythms are not usually seen until the affected individual grows older. Features also seen on the ECG include right atrial enlargement and varying degrees of atrioventricular block. When a person is suspected of having an ASD based on the findings of an incomplete right bundle branch block with a rSr' or rSR', the frontal plane QRS should be examined. The frontal plane QRS is the most helpful clue to distinguish between an ostium secundum ASD and an ostium primum ASD. In primum defects left axis deviation is seen in most patients with an axis of > -30 degrees and very few patients have right axis deviation. In contrast ostium secundum defects have an axis between 0 degrees and 180 degrees with most cases to the right of 100 degrees.

In the ECG above, you can see an example of the rSR' pattern in V1 with a R' greater than S with T wave inversion which is commonly seen in volume overload right ventricular hypertrophy.

== Diagnosis ==
=== Classification ===
A defect in the ostium primum is occasionally classified as an atrial septal defect, but it is more commonly classified as an atrioventricular septal defect.

== Treatment ==
Hemodynamically significant ASDs (flow ratio 1.5:1) are large enough to be closed surgically. The long term prognosis is excellent. Pulmonary hypertension with shunt reversal is a contraindication for surgery, however the pulmonary hypertension can frequently be treated with medicines. The hole can then be closed safely with a good long term prognosis.
