= Sinus venosus atrial septal defect =

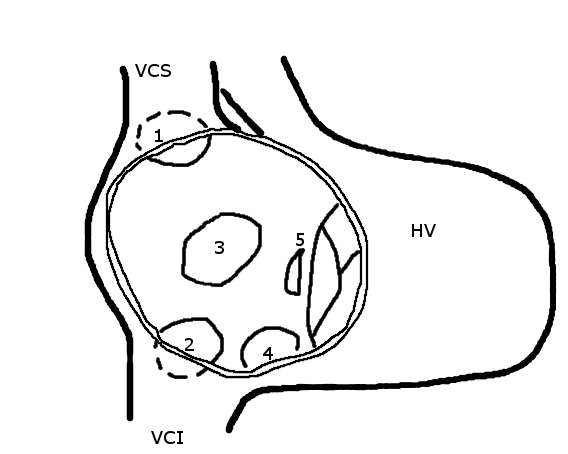
- ASD locations. (1: upper sinus venosus defect; 2: lower sinus venosus defect.)
- Specialty: Cardiac surgery

A sinus venosus atrial septal defect is a type of atrial septal defect primarily associated with the sinus venosus.

They represent 5% of atrial septal defects.

They can occur near the superior vena cava or inferior vena cava, but the former are more common.

They can be associated with anomalous pulmonary venous connection.
