= Vein of Galen aneurysmal malformations =

- Other names: Vein of Galen aneurysmal dilations
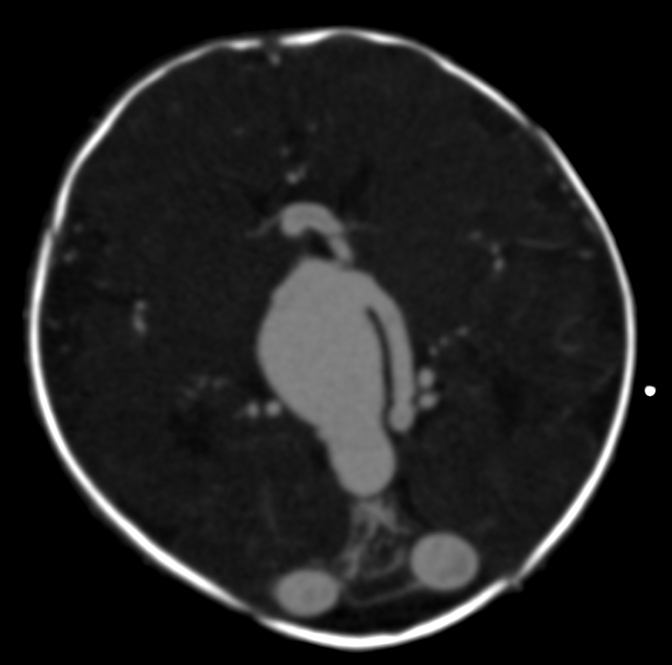
- Axial image from computerized tomography angiogram showing arteriovenous communication in vein of Galen malformation

Vein of Galen aneurysmal malformations (VGAMs) and Vein of Galen aneurysmal dilations (VGADs) are the most frequent arteriovenous malformations in infants and fetuses. A VGAM consists of a tangled mass of dilated vessels supplied by an enlarged artery. The malformation increases greatly in size with age, although the mechanism of the increase is unknown. Dilation of the great cerebral vein of Galen is a secondary result of the force of arterial blood either directly from an artery via an arteriovenous fistula or by way of a tributary vein that receives the blood directly from an artery. There is usually a venous anomaly downstream from the draining vein that, together with the high blood flow into the great cerebral vein of Galen causes its dilation. The right sided cardiac chambers and pulmonary arteries also develop mild to severe dilation.

== Signs and symptoms ==
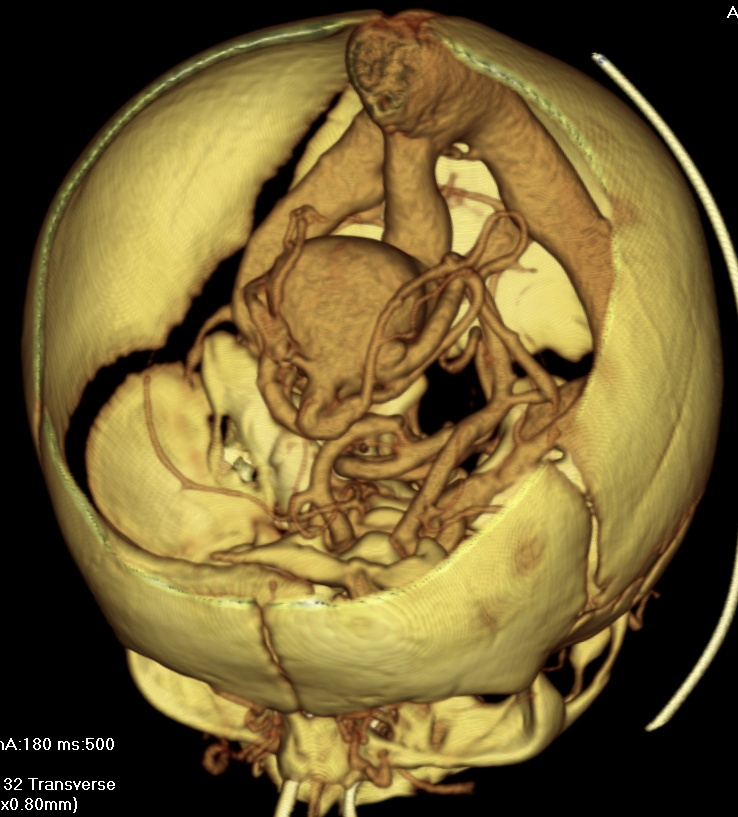
3D reconstruction of CTA showing vein of Galen malformation.

Malformations often lead to cardiac failure, cranial bruits (pattern 1), hydrocephaly, and subarachnoid hemorrhage in neonates. The heart failure is due to the size of the arteriovenous shunt that can steal 80% or more of the cardiac output, with large volumes of blood under high pressure returning to the right heart and pulmonary circulation and sinus venosus atrial septal defects. It is also the most common cause of death in such patients.

=== Associated conditions ===
Non-developmental syndromes also directly or indirectly affect the Great Cerebral Vein of Galen, although they are extremely rare. These include superior vena cava syndrome (SVCS), and thrombosis of the lateral sinus, superior sagittal sinus, internal jugular vein, or of the Great Cerebral Vein of Galen itself.

== Genetics ==
10% of vein of Galen aneurysmal malformations are associated with deleterious heterozygous mutations of EPHB4.

Another study found that 30% of cases were associated with mutations in EPH receptor B4 (EPHB4) gene.

== Diagnosis ==
Testing for a malformed vein of Galen is indicated when a patient has heart failure which has no obvious cause. Diagnosis is generally achieved by signs such as cranial bruits and symptoms such as expanded facial veins. The vein of Galen can be visualized using ultrasound or Doppler. A malformed Great Cerebral Vein will be noticeably enlarged. Ultrasound is a particularly useful tool for vein of Galen malformations because so many cases occur in infancy and ultrasound can make diagnoses prenatally. Many cases are diagnosed only during autopsy as congestive heart failure occurs very early.

=== Classification ===
Five patterns of Galenic arteriovenous malformations have been described:

Patterns
Pattern 1	Many vessels, including anterior cerebral arteries, thalamic perforating arteries, and superior cerebellar arteries discharge into the vein of Galen.
Pattern 2	A single posterior choroidal artery drains into the vein of Galen.
Pattern 3	One or both posterior choroidal and one or both anterior cerebral arteries drain directly into the Galenic system.
Pattern 4	An angiomatous network of posterior choroidal and thalamic perforating arteries enter the Vein of Galen directly.
Pattern 5	A high flow arteriovenous malformation in the right inferior frontal lobe drains via the inferior sagittal sinus and pericallosal vein into the Vein of Galen.

These malformations develop in utero by the persistence of fistulae between primitive pia arachnoidal arteries and pial veins that cross each other at right angles. Because the primitive Galenic system and the primitive choroidal system lie close together, an arteriovenous malformation involving the primitive choroidal system will inevitably involve the Galenic vein. Larger arteriovenous shunts correlate with greater hemodynamic effects and earlier symptom onset; small arteriovenous shunts correlate with greater local mass effect causing progressive neurological impairment.

== Treatment ==
Treatment depends on the anatomy of the malformation as determined by angiography or Magnetic Resonance Imaging (MRI).

=== Surgical ===
Head circumference measurements should be obtained regularly and monitored carefully to detect hydrocephalus. Neurosurgical procedures to relieve hydrocephalus are important. A ventriculoperitoneal shunt may be required in some infants. A pediatric cardiologist should be consulted to manage high-output failure, if present. Often patients need to be intubated. In most cases, the fistulous arteries feeding into the Vein of Galen must be blocked, thereby reducing the blood flow into the vein. Open surgery has a high morbidity and mortality. Recent advances over the past few decades have made endovascular embolization the preferred method of treatment. These treatments are preferred because they offer little threat to the surrounding brain tissue. However, there have been several reported cases of arteriovenous malformations recurring. The young age of many patients, the complex vascular anatomy, and the sensitive location of the Vein of Galen offer considerable challenges to surgeons. Another treatment option is radiotherapy, also called radiosurgery, which involves the use of focused beams to damage the blood vessel. Radiotherapy is often not pursued as a treatment because the effects of the procedure can take months or years and there is risk of damaging adjacent brain tissue.

=== Medical care ===
Surgery is not always an option when the anatomy of the malformation creates too much of a risk. Recent improvements in endovascular procedures have made many cases, which were not surgically accessible, treatable. Endovascular treatments involve delivering drugs, balloons, or coils to the site of the malformation through blood vessels via catheters. These treatments work by limiting blood flow through the vein. There is, however, still risk of complications from endovascular treatments. The wall of the vein can be damaged during the procedure and, in some cases, the emboli can become dislodged and travel through the vascular system. Two-dimensional echocardiography with color-flow imaging and pulsed Doppler ultrasound was used to evaluate one fetus and five neonates with a Vein of Galen malformation. Color-flow imaging and pulsed Doppler ultrasonography provided anatomical and pathophysiological information regarding cardiac hemodynamics and intracranial blood flow; with the patient's clinical status, these methods provided a reliable, noninvasive means to evaluate the effectiveness of therapy and the need for further treatment in neonates with Vein of Galen malformations. When none of these procedures are viable, shunting can be used to ameliorate the pressure inside the varix. Seizures usually are managed with antiepileptic medications.

== Prognosis ==
The complications that are usually associated with vein of Galen malformations are usually intracranial hemorrhages. Over half the patients with VGAM have a malformation that cannot be corrected. Patients frequently die in the neonatal period or in early infancy.

== Society and culture ==
Vein of Galen malformations are devastating complications. Studies have shown that 77% of untreated cases result in mortality. Even after surgical treatment, the mortality rate remains as high as 39.4%. Most cases occur during infancy when the mortality rates are at their highest. Vein of Galen malformations are a relatively unknown condition, attributed to the rareness of the malformations. Therefore, when a child is diagnosed with a faulty Great Cerebral Vein of Galen, most parents know little to nothing about what they are dealing with.
