= Hypervalinemia =

- Other names: Valinemia or Valine transaminase deficiency
- Valine
- Symptoms: loss of appetite, vomiting, hypotonia, dehydration and failure to thrive.
- Usual onset: 1–2 years

Hypervalinemia is a rare autosomal recessive metabolic disorder in which urinary and serum levels of the branched-chain amino acid valine are elevated, without related elevation of the branched-chain amino acids leucine and isoleucine. It is caused by a deficiency of the enzyme valine transaminase.

== Presentation ==
Presenting in infancy, symptoms include lack of appetite, vomiting, dehydration, hypotonia and failure to thrive.

== Genetics ==
Hypervalinemia has an autosomal recessive pattern of inheritance.

Hypervalinemia is inherited in an autosomal recessive manner. This means the defective gene responsible for the disorder is located on an autosome, and two copies of the defective gene (one inherited from each parent) are required in order to be born with the disorder. The parents of an individual with an autosomal recessive disorder both carry one copy of the defective gene, but usually do not experience any signs or symptoms of the disorder.

== See also ==
- Isovaleric acidemia
- Maple syrup urine disease
- Propionic acidemia
