= Vestibulocochlear dysfunction progressive familial =

- Other names: Familial progressive vestibulocochlear dysfunction
- Autosomal dominant is the inheritance pattern of this disorder

Vestibulocochlear dysfunction progressive familial, known also as familial progressive vestibulocochlear dysfunction is an autosomal dominant disease that results in sensorineural hearing loss and vestibular areflexia. Patients report feelings of vague dizziness, blurred vision, dysequilibrium in the dark, and progressive hearing impairment.

== Symptoms and signs ==
Reported symptoms include:

- Sensorineural hearing loss
- Vestibular areflexia
- Hearing impairment
- Vertigo
- Nausea and vomiting
- Head movement-dependent oscillopsia

== Cause ==
The disease is an inherited autosomal dominant disease, but the physiological cause of the dysfunction is still unclear. An acidophyllic mucopolysaccharide-containing substance was discovered, especially in cochleas, maculas, and crista ampullaris of patients with DFNA9 (a chromosome locus), as well as severe degeneration of vestibular and cochlear sensory axons and dendrites. It is suggested that the mucopolysaccharide deposit could cause strangulation of nerve endings.

The maculas and crista ampullaris are what allow for non-visual sensation of head movements. The crista ampullaris resides in the semicircular canals of the inner ear and detects angular acceleration, while the maculas are housed within the vestibule of the inner ear and detect linear acceleration. When affected, these organs can lead to vertigo and nausea because the body would always feel off-balance.
