= Eisenmenger syndrome =

- Other names: ES, Eisenmenger's syndrome, Eisenmenger reaction, tardive cyanosis.
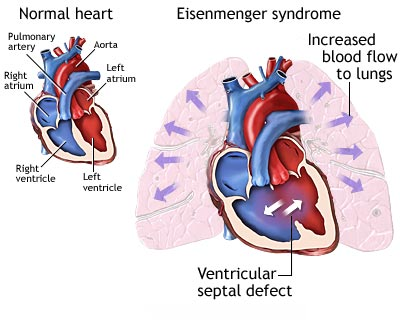
- Eisenmenger Syndrome due to a ventricular septal defect
- Specialty: Medical genetics, cardiology
- Treatment: Supportive measures, transplant surgery
- Frequency: 0.0005%

Eisenmenger syndrome or Eisenmenger's syndrome is defined as the process in which a long-standing left-to-right cardiac shunt caused by a congenital heart defect (typically by a ventricular septal defect, atrial septal defect, or less commonly, patent ductus arteriosus) causes pulmonary hypertension and eventual reversal of the shunt into a cyanotic right-to-left shunt. Because of the advent of fetal screening with echocardiography early in life, the incidence of heart defects progressing to Eisenmenger syndrome has decreased.

Eisenmenger syndrome in a pregnant mother can cause serious complications, though successful delivery has been reported. Maternal mortality ranges from 30% to 60%, and may be attributed to fainting spells, blood clots forming in the veins and traveling to distant sites, hypovolemia, coughing up blood or preeclampsia. Most deaths occur either during or within the first weeks after delivery. Pregnant women with Eisenmenger syndrome should be hospitalized after the 20th week of pregnancy, or earlier if clinical deterioration occurs.

== Signs and symptoms ==
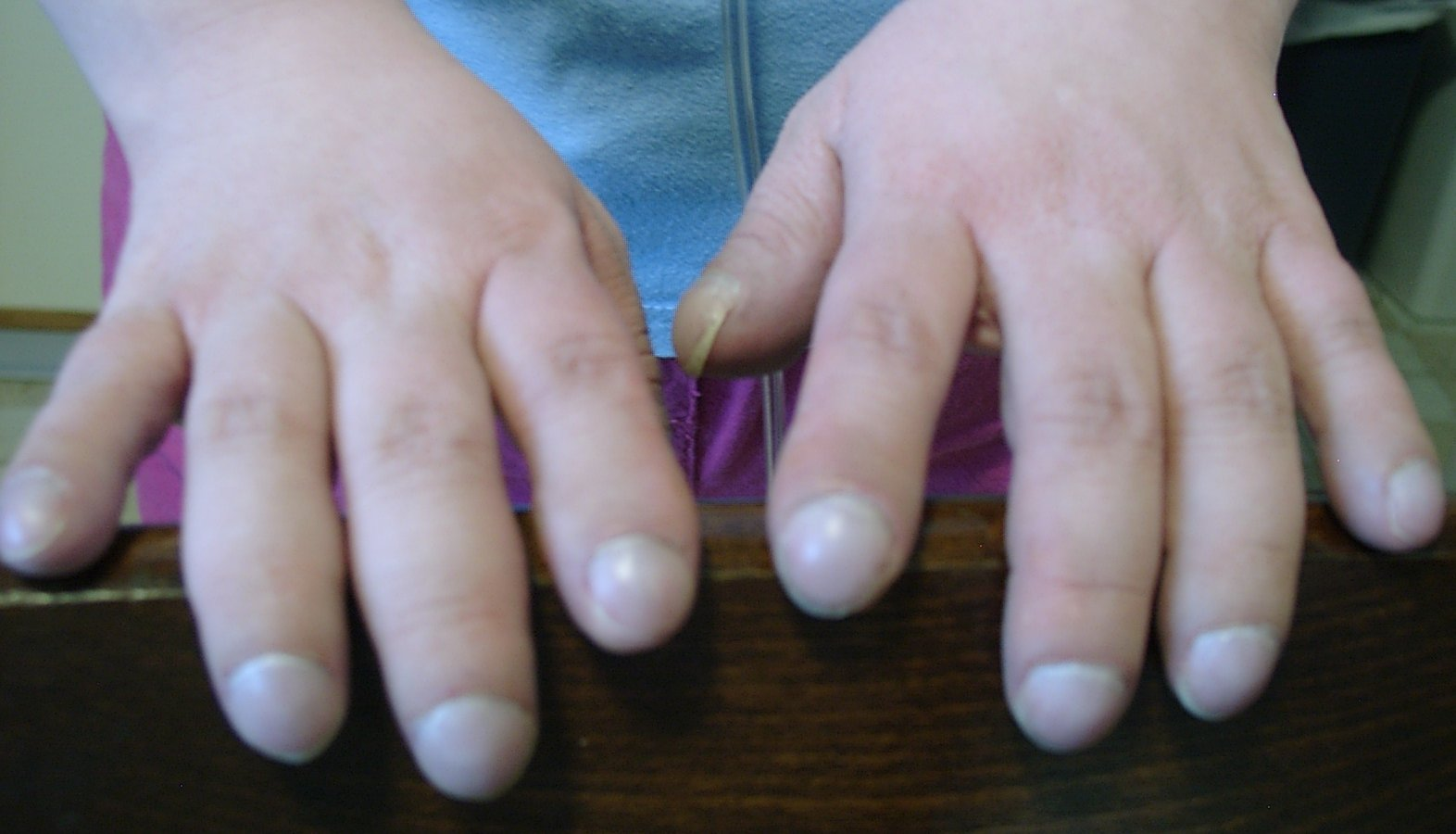
Nail clubbing of fingers in a patient with Eisenmenger syndrome. First described by Hippocrates, clubbing is also known as "Hippocratic fingers".

Signs and symptoms of Eisenmenger syndrome include the following:

- Cyanosis (a blue tinge to the skin resulting from lack of oxygen)
- High red blood cell count
- Swollen or clubbed fingertips (clubbing)
- Fainting (also known as syncope)
- Heart failure
- Abnormal heart rhythms
- Bleeding disorders
- Coughing up blood
- Iron deficiency
- Infections (endocarditis and pneumonia)
- Kidney problems
- Stroke
- Gout (rarely) due to increased uric acid resorption and production with impaired excretion
- Gallstones

One of the most severe and common complications of Eisenmenger syndrome is cardiac arrhythmia, especially supraventricular arrhythmias. Approximately 40% of patients diagnosed with Eisenmenger syndrome were also found to have these arrhythmias during routine ECG screenings. These arrhythmias have worse prognosis in patients with Eisenmenger syndrome, compared to the general population, and can be a source of sudden cardiac death.

== Causes ==
A number of congenital heart defects can cause Eisenmenger syndrome, including atrial septal defects, ventricular septal defects, patent ductus arteriosus, and more complex types of acyanotic heart disease.

== Diagnosis ==
Diagnosis of Eisenmenger syndrome is typically conducted via transthoracic echocardiography, which facilitates the identification and evaluation of shunts, anatomical defects, and ventricular function. Following diagnosis, or in some cases of inconclusive diagnosis, a cardiac catheter may be used to both confirm the diagnosis and to assess the patient's pulmonary arterial pressure, an important predictive value for prognosis and treatment.

== Treatment ==
If the inciting defect in the heart is identified before it causes significant pulmonary hypertension, it can normally be repaired through surgery, preventing the disease. After pulmonary hypertension is sufficient to reverse the blood flow through the defect, however, the maladaptation is considered irreversible, and a heart–lung transplant or a lung transplant with repair of the heart is the only curative option. Transplantation is the final therapeutic option and only for patients with poor prognosis and quality of life. Timing and appropriateness of transplantation remain difficult decisions. 5-year and 10-year survival ranges between 70% and 80%, 50% and 70%, 30% and 50%, respectively. Since the average life expectancy of patients after lung transplantation is as low as 30% at 5 years, patients with reasonable functional status related to Eisenmenger syndrome have improved survival with conservative medical care compared with transplantation.

Various medicines and therapies for pulmonary hypertension are under investigation for treatment of the symptoms.

Antiarrhythmic drugs are important for many patients with Eisenmenger syndrome, as evidence suggests that arrhythmia-induced sudden cardiac death may be the leading cause of death among patients with the disease. These therapies generally aim to restore and maintain sinus rhythm, but the specific interventions chosen will depend on the nature of the patient's arrhythmia.

== Etymology ==
Eisenmenger syndrome was named by Paul Wood after Victor Eisenmenger, who first described the condition in 1897.
