= Vitamin E deficiency =

Disease caused by lack of dietary vitamin E

- Specialty: Gastroenterology, neurology
- Usual onset: Insidious
- Causes: Malabsorption
- Risk factors: Crohn's disease, celiac disease, cystic fibrosis, chronic pancreatitis, malnutrition
- Diagnostic method: Serum α-tocopherol titer
- Treatment: Vitamin E supplementation

Vitamin E deficiency is a rare condition caused by low levels of vitamin E that may result from malabsorption disorders (such as abetalipoproteinemia, cystic fibrosis, or Crohn's disease), or impaired lipid transport. As a potent antioxidant, vitamin E protects cell membranes from oxidative damage, and its deficiency primarily affects tissues with high fatty acid content, especially the nervous system. Clinically, patients may present with spinocerebellar ataxia, polyneuropathy, muscle weakness, and retinopathy. Diagnosis is confirmed through low serum vitamin E levels, and treatment involves dietary supplementation with vitamin E and (if possible) addressing the underlying cause of malabsorption. The term 'vitamin E' commonly refers to α-tocopherol, and so α-tocopherol deficiency refers to the same syndrome.

== Signs and symptoms ==
Vitamin E deficiency is typically seen only in the setting of severe and prolonged illnesses causing steatorrhea or other forms of malabsorption. Other patients may have had bariatric surgery or surgical removal of the small intestine. Many of these patients also have deficiencies of other fat-soluble vitamins, and an isolated deficiency of vitamin E is rare. As a result, it may be difficult to definitively identify vitamin E as the cause of any of these symptoms until they are well-progressed.

Typically, the first identifiable sign of vitamin E deficiency is areflexia, or the loss of deep tendon reflexes, like the patellar reflex. The usual progression is then to ataxic gait (which continues to progressively worsen) and then to a loss of dorsal column sensations (position and vibration). The onset and progression of symptoms is slow, often taking years to be recognized.

Signs of vitamin E deficiency include the following:

- Neuromuscular problems – such as spinocerebellar ataxia and myopathies.
- Neurological problems – may include dysarthria, absence of deep tendon reflexes, loss of the ability to sense vibration and detect where body parts are in three-dimensional space, and positive Babinski sign.
- Hemolytic anemia – due to oxidative damage to red blood cells. Typically only seen in children with either cystic fibrosis or long-term cholestasis.
- Retinopathy and ophthalmoplegia.
- Impairment of the immune response
- Skeletal muscle myopathy

== Causes ==
Vitamin E deficiency is rare. There are no records of it from a simple lack of vitamin E in a person's diet, but it can arise from physiological abnormalities. It occurs in the people in the following situations:

- Premature, very low birth weight infants – birth weights less than 1500 grams (3.3 pounds).
- Isolated vitamin E deficiency or 'ataxia with isolated with vitamin E deficiency' is an inheritable deficiency of vitamin E caused by mutations in the gene for the tocopherol (vitamin E) transfer protein. These patients are the only ones who are unlikely to have other nutrient deficiencies. Because their condition is characterized by a deficiency in cellular transport of the vitamin, they may require supplements at much higher dosages than other patients with vitamin E deficiency.
- Fat malabsorption – Some dietary fat is needed to absorb vitamin E from the gastrointestinal tract. Anyone diagnosed with cystic fibrosis, individuals who have had part or all of their stomach removed or who have had a gastric bypass, and individuals with malabsorptive problems such as Crohn's disease, liver disease or exocrine pancreatic insufficiency may not absorb fat (people who cannot absorb fat often pass greasy stools or have chronic diarrhea and bloating). Abetalipoproteinemia is a rare inherited disorder of fat metabolism that results in poor absorption of dietary fat and vitamin E. The vitamin E deficiency associated with this disease causes problems such as poor transmission of nerve impulses and muscle weakness.
- Bariatric surgery - Surgery as a treatment for obesity can lead to vitamin deficiencies. Long-term follow-up reported a 16.5% prevalence of vitamin E deficiency. There are guidelines for multivitamin supplementation, but adherence rates are reported to be less than 20%.

== Diagnosis ==
The U.S. Institute of Medicine defines deficiency as a serum concentration of less than 12 μmol/L. The symptoms can be enough for a diagnosis to be formed.

== Treatment ==
Treatment is oral vitamin E supplementation.

== See also ==
- Familial isolated vitamin E deficiency
- Abetalipoproteinemia
- Tocopherol
