= Van Den Bosch syndrome =

- Other names: Mental deficiency, choroideremia, acrokeratosis verruciformis, anhidrosis, skeletal deformity

van Den Bosch syndrome is a rare X-linked syndrome like intellectual disability. It may be caused by a small X-chromosome deletion.

The condition can be detected around infancy.

== Epidemiology ==
According to Orphanet the condition occurs in 1 in 1 million people.

It has been reported in only one family.

== Symptoms ==
Symptoms for the condition include.

- Abnormal electroretinogram
- Acrokeratosis
- Anhidrotic ectodermal dysplasia
- Choroideremia
- Heat intolerance
- High myopia
- Horizontal nystagmus
- Intellectual disability
- Recurrent respiratory infections
- Recurrent skin infections
- Scapular winging
- Unfavorable response of muscle weakness to acetylcholinesterase inhibitors
- skeletal abnormality
- Anhidrosis
- Contiguous gene syndrome
- X-linked inheritance

== History ==
It was first described by J. Van den Bosch in 1959. He reported the condition in 2 brothers. The condition was found in more males spanning three generations. According to Orphanet there have been no more descriptions in literature since 1959.
