= Atrial septal defect =

Human heart defect present at birth

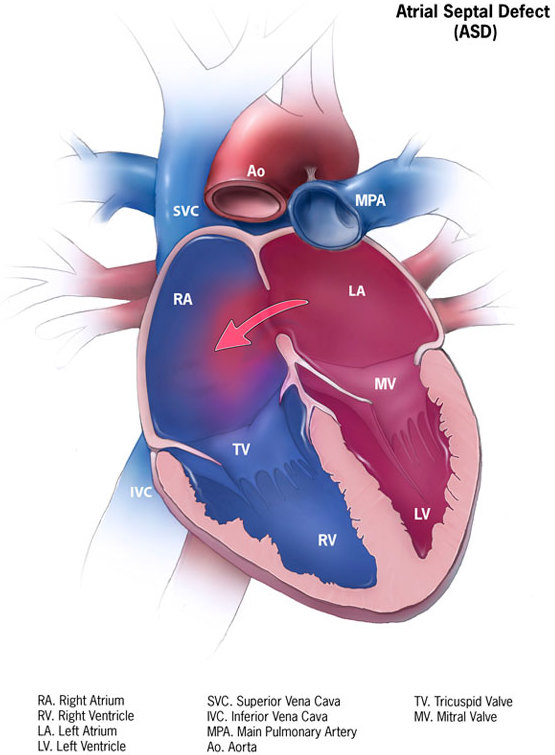
- Illustration of an atrial septal defect.
- Specialty: Cardiac surgery
- Symptoms: asymptomatic

Atrial septal defect (ASD) is a congenital heart defect in which blood flows between the atria (upper chambers) of the heart. Some flow is a normal condition both pre-birth and immediately post-birth via the foramen ovale; however, when this does not naturally close after birth it is referred to as a patent (open) foramen ovale (PFO). It is common in patients with a congenital atrial septal aneurysm (ASA).

After the closure of foramen ovale, the atria normally are separated by a dividing wall, the interatrial septum. If this septum is defective or absent, then oxygen-rich blood can flow directly from the left side of the heart to mix with the oxygen-poor blood in the right side of the heart; or the opposite, depending on which chamber has the higher blood pressure. In the absence of other heart defects, the left atrium has the higher pressure. This can lead to lower-than-normal oxygen levels in the arterial blood that supplies the brain, organs, and tissues. However, an ASD may not produce noticeable signs or symptoms, especially if the defect is small. Also, in terms of health risks, people who have had a cryptogenic stroke are more likely to have a PFO than the general population.

A cardiac shunt is the presence of a net flow of blood through a defect, either from left to right or right to left. The amount of shunting present, if any, determines the hemodynamic significance of the ASD. A right-to-left-shunt results in venous blood entering the left side of the heart and into the arterial circulation without being oxygenated. This may result in the clinical finding of cyanosis, the presence of bluish-colored skin, especially of the lips and under the nails, while a left-to-right-shunt results in already oxygenated blood entering the deoxygenated side causing increased pressure in the right heart.

During development of the baby, the interatrial septum develops to separate the left and right atria. However, a hole in the septum called the foramen ovale allows blood from the right atrium to enter the left atrium during fetal development. This allows blood to bypass the nonfunctional fetal lungs while the fetus obtains its oxygen from the placenta. A layer of tissue called the septum primum acts as a valve over the foramen ovale during fetal development. After birth, the pressure in the right side of the heart drops as the lungs open and begin working, causing the foramen ovale to close entirely. In about 25% of adults, the foramen ovale does not entirely seal. In these cases, any elevation of the pressure in the pulmonary circulatory system (due to pulmonary hypertension, temporarily while coughing, etc.) can cause the foramen ovale to remain open.

== Types ==
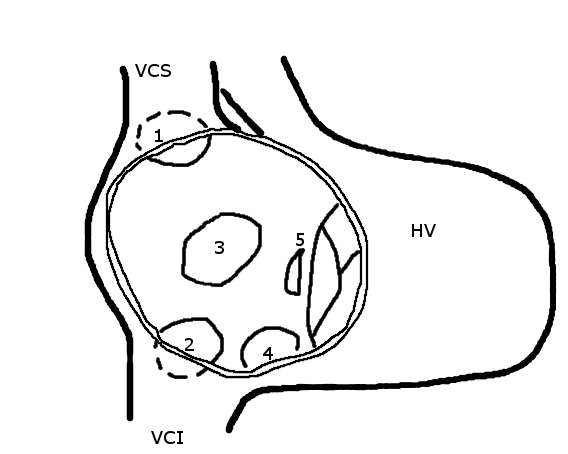
Schematic drawing showing the location of different types of ASD, the view is into an opened right atrium. HV: right ventricle; VCS: superior vena cava; VCI: inferior vena cava 1: upper sinus venosus defect; 2: lower sinus venosus defect; 3: secundum defect; 4: defect involving coronary sinus; 5; primum defect.

The six types of atrial septal defects are differentiated from each other by whether they involve other structures of the heart and how they are formed during the developmental process during early fetal development.

=== Ostium secundum ===
The ostium secundum atrial septal defect is the most common type of atrial septal defect and comprises 6–10% of all congenital heart diseases. It involves a patent ostium secundum (that is, a patent foramen secundum). The secundum atrial septal defect usually arises from an enlarged foramen ovale, inadequate growth of the septum secundum, or excessive absorption of the septum primum. About 10 to 20% of individuals with ostium secundum ASDs also have mitral valve prolapse.

An ostium secundum ASD accompanied by an acquired mitral valve stenosis is called Lutembacher's syndrome.

==== Natural history ====
Most individuals with an uncorrected secundum ASD do not have significant symptoms through early adulthood. More than 70% develop symptoms by about 40 years of age. Symptoms are typically decreased exercise tolerance, easy fatigability, palpitations, and syncope.

Complications of an uncorrected secundum ASD include pulmonary hypertension, right-sided congestive heart failure.

While pulmonary hypertension is unusual before 20 years of age, it is seen in 50% of individuals above the age of 40. Progression to Eisenmenger's syndrome occurs in 5 to 10% of individuals late in the disease process.

=== Patent foramen ovale ===
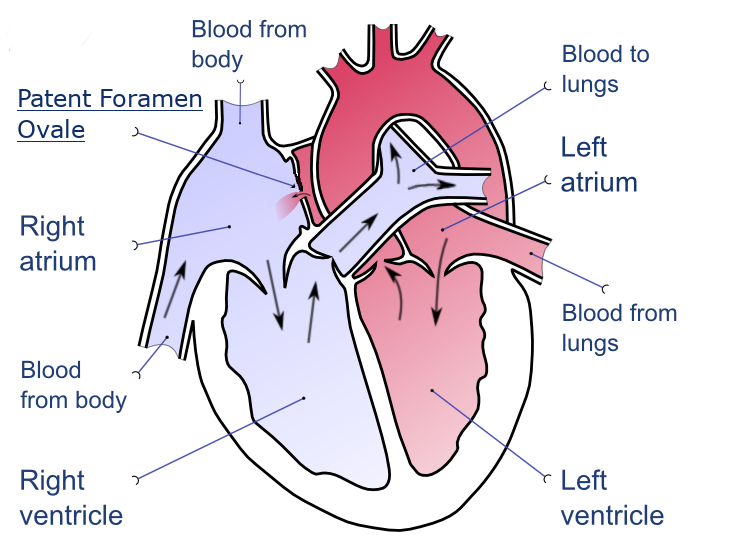
Patent foramen ovale

A patent foramen ovale (PFO) is a remnant opening of the fetal foramen ovale, which often closes after a person's birth. This remnant opening is caused by the incomplete fusion of the septum primum and the septum secundum; in healthy hearts, this fusion forms the fossa ovalis, a portion of the interatrial septum which corresponds to the location of the foramen ovale in the fetus. In medical use, the term "patent" means open or unobstructed. In about 25% of people, the foramen ovale does not close, leaving them with a PFO or at least with what some physicians classify as a "pro-PFO", which is a PFO that is normally closed, but can open under increased right atrial pressure. On echocardiography, shunting of blood may not be noted except when the patient coughs.

PFO is linked to stroke, sleep apnea, migraine with aura, cluster headache, decompression sickness, Raynaud's phenomenon, hyperventilation syndrome, transient global amnesia (TGA), and leftsided carcinoid heart disease (mitral valve). No cause is established for a foramen ovale to remain open instead of closing, but heredity and genetics may play a role. In rats research showed a link to the amount of Cryptosporidium infestation and the number of newborn rats that failed to close their foramen ovale. PFO is not treated in the absence of other symptoms.

The mechanism by which a PFO may play a role in stroke is called paradoxical embolism. In the case of PFO, a blood clot from the venous circulatory system is able to pass from the right atrium directly into the left atrium via the PFO, rather than being filtered by the lungs, and thereupon into systemic circulation toward the brain. Also multiple substances – including the prothrombotic agent serotonin – are shunted bypassing the lungs. PFO is common in patients with an atrial septal aneurysm (ASA), a much rarer condition, which is also linked to cryptogenic (i.e., of unknown cause) stroke.

PFO is more common in people with cryptogenic stroke than in those with a stroke of known cause. While PFO is present in 25% in the general population, the probability of someone having a PFO increases to about 40 to 50% in those who have had a cryptogenic stroke, and more so in those who have a stroke before the age of 55. Treatment with anticoagulant and antiplatelet medications in this group appear similar.

=== Ostium primum ===
A defect in the ostium primum is occasionally classified as an atrial septal defect, but it is more commonly classified as an atrioventricular septal defect. Ostium primum defects are less common than ostium secundum defects. This type of defect is usually associated with Down syndrome.

=== Sinus venosus ===
A sinus venosus ASD is a type of atrial septum defect in which the defect involves the venous inflow of either the superior vena cava or the inferior vena cava.

A sinus venosus ASD that involves the superior vena cava makes up 2 to 3% of all interatrial communication. It is located at the junction of the superior vena cava and the right atrium. It is frequently associated with anomalous drainage of the right-sided pulmonary veins into the right atrium (instead of the normal drainage of the pulmonary veins into the left atrium).

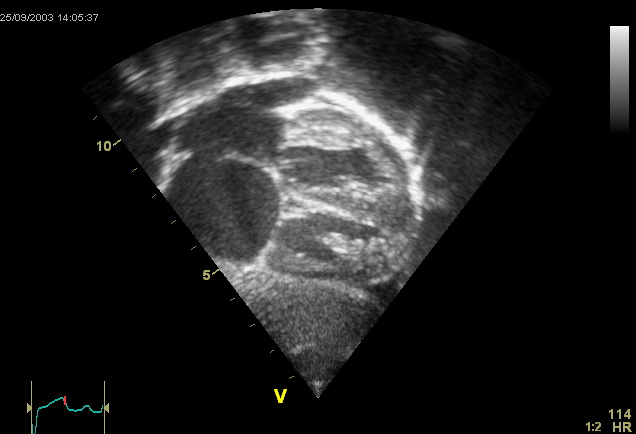
Ultrasound picture of the heart, seen in a subcostal view: The apex is towards the right, the atria are to the left. ASD secundum seen as a discontinuation of the white band of the atrial septum. The enlarged right atrium is below. The enlarged pulmonary veins are seen entering the left atrium above.

=== Common or single atrium ===
Common (or single) atrium is a failure of development of the embryologic components that contribute to the atrial septal complex. It is frequently associated with heterotaxy syndrome.

=== Mixed ===
The interatrial septum can be divided into five septal zones. If the defect involves two or more of the septal zones, then the defect is termed a mixed atrial septal defect.

== Presentation ==
=== Complications ===
Due to the communication between the atria that occurs in ASDs, disease entities or complications from the condition are possible. Patients with an uncorrected atrial septal defect may be at increased risk for developing a cardiac arrhythmia, as well as more frequent respiratory infections.

==== Decompression sickness ====
ASDs, and particularly PFOs, are a predisposing venous blood carrying inert gases, such as helium or nitrogen does not pass through the lungs. The only way to release the excess inert gases from the body is to pass the blood carrying the inert gases through the lungs to be exhaled. If some of the inert gas-laden blood passes through the PFO, it avoids the lungs and the inert gas is more likely to form large bubbles in the arterial blood stream causing decompression sickness.

==== Eisenmenger's syndrome ====
If a net flow of blood exists from the left atrium to the right atrium, called a left-to-right shunt, then an increase in the blood flow through the lungs happens. Initially, this increased blood flow is asymptomatic, but if it persists, the pulmonary blood vessels may stiffen, causing pulmonary hypertension, which increases the pressures in the right side of the heart, leading to the reversal of the shunt into a right-to-left shunt. Reversal of the shunt occurs, and the blood flowing in the opposite direction through the ASD is called Eisenmenger's syndrome, a rare and late complication of an ASD.

==== Paradoxical embolus ====
Venous thrombus (clots in the veins) are quite common. Embolizations (dislodgement of thrombi) normally go to the lung and cause pulmonary emboli. In an individual with ASD, these emboli can potentially enter the arterial system, which can cause any phenomenon attributed to acute loss of blood to a portion of the body, including cerebrovascular accident (stroke), infarction of the spleen or intestines, or even a distal extremity (i.e., finger or toe).

This is known as a paradoxical embolus because the clot material paradoxically enters the arterial system instead of going to the lungs.

==== Migraine ====
Some recent research has suggested that a proportion of cases of migraine may be caused by PFO. While the exact mechanism remains unclear, closure of a PFO can reduce symptoms in certain cases. This remains controversial; 20% of the general population has a PFO, which for the most part, is asymptomatic. About 20% of the female population has migraines, and the placebo effect in migraine typically averages around 40%. The high frequency of these facts make finding statistically significant relationships between PFO and migraine difficult (i.e., the relationship may just be chance or coincidence). In a large randomized controlled trial, the higher prevalence of PFO in migraine patients was confirmed, but migraine headache cessation was not more prevalent in the group of migraine patients who underwent closure of their PFOs.

== Causes ==
- Down syndrome – patients with Down syndrome have higher rates of ASDs, especially a particular type that involves the ventricular wall. As many as one half of patients with Down syndrome have some type of septal defect.
- Ebstein's anomaly – about 50% of individuals with Ebstein anomaly have an associated shunt between the right and left atria, either an atrial septal defect or a patent foramen ovale.
- Fetal alcohol syndrome – about one in four patients with fetal alcohol syndrome has either an ASD or a ventricular septal defect.
- Holt–Oram syndrome – both the ostium secundum and ostium primum types of ASD are associated with Holt–Oram syndrome
- Lutembacher's syndrome – the presence of a congenital ASD along with acquired mitral stenosis

== Mechanisms ==
In unaffected individuals, the chambers of the left side of the heart are under higher pressure than the chambers of the right side because the left ventricle has to produce enough pressure to pump blood throughout the entire body, while the right ventricle needs only to produce enough pressure to pump blood to the lungs.

In the case of a large ASD (> 9 mm), which may result in a clinically remarkable left-to-right shunt, blood shunts from the left atrium to the right atrium. This extra blood from the left atrium may cause a volume overload of both the right atrium and the right ventricle. If untreated, this condition can result in enlargement of the right side of the heart and ultimately heart failure.

Any process that increases the pressure in the left ventricle can cause worsening of the left-to-right shunt. This includes hypertension, which increases the pressure that the left ventricle has to generate to open the aortic valve during ventricular systole, and coronary artery disease which increases the stiffness of the left ventricle, thereby increasing the filling pressure of the left ventricle during ventricular diastole. The left-to-right shunt increases the filling pressure of the right heart (preload) and forces the right ventricle to pump out more blood than the left ventricle. This constant overloading of the right side of the heart causes an overload of the entire pulmonary vasculature. Eventually, pulmonary hypertension may develop.

The pulmonary hypertension will cause the right ventricle to face increased afterload. The right ventricle is forced to generate higher pressures to try to overcome the pulmonary hypertension. This may lead to right ventricular failure (dilatation and decreased systolic function of the right ventricle).

If the ASD is left uncorrected, the pulmonary hypertension progresses and the pressure in the right side of the heart becomes greater than the left side of the heart. This reversal of the pressure gradient across the ASD causes the shunt to reverse – a right-to-left shunt. This phenomenon is known as Eisenmenger's syndrome. Once right-to-left shunting occurs, a portion of the oxygen-poor blood gets shunted to the left side of the heart and ejected to the peripheral vascular system. This causes signs of cyanosis.

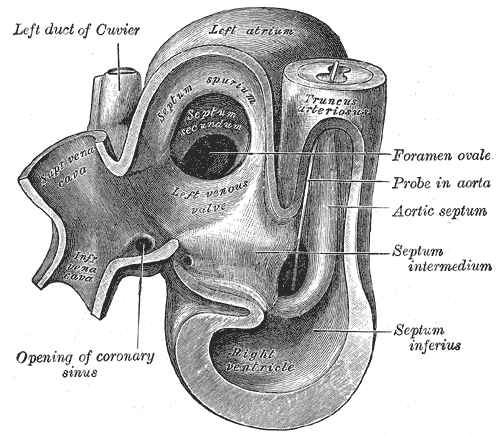
Heart of human embryo of about 35 days

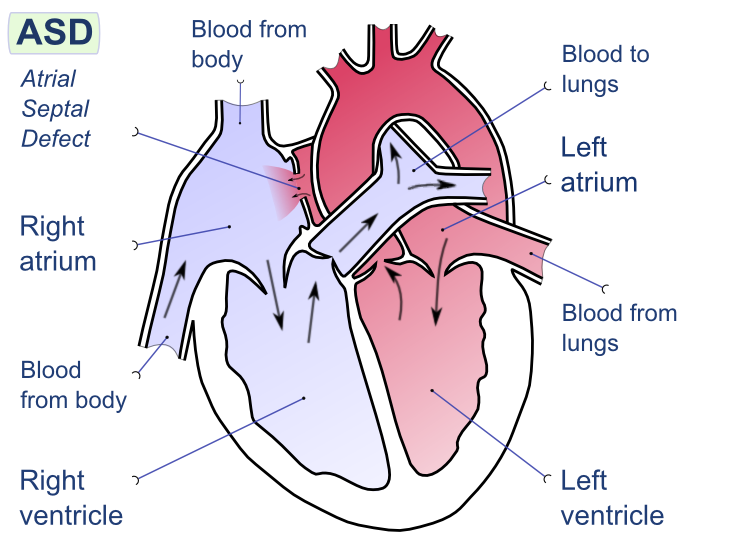
Atrial septal defect with left-to-right shunt

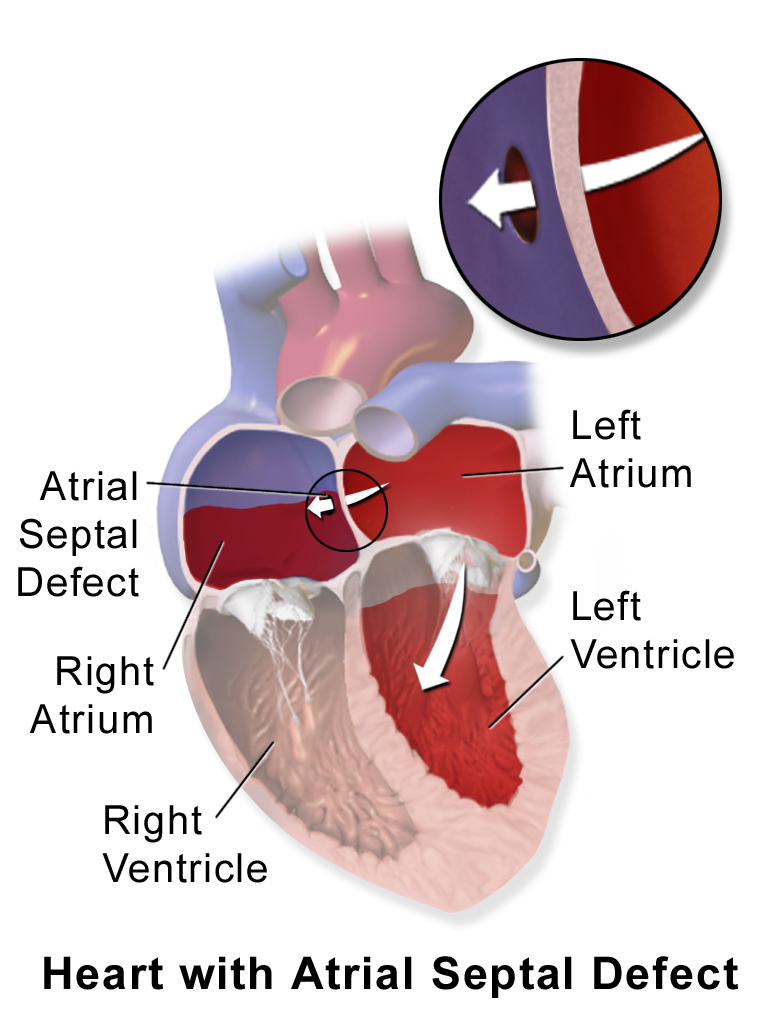
Illustration depicting atrial septal defect

== Diagnosis ==
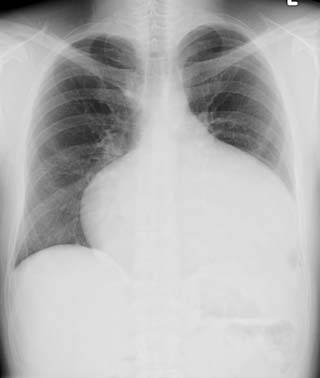
Abnormal chest X-ray as seen in a patient of atrial septal defect

Most individuals with a significant ASD are diagnosed in utero or in early childhood with the use of ultrasonography or auscultation of the heart sounds during physical examination. Some individuals with an ASD have surgical correction of their ASD during childhood. The development of signs and symptoms due to an ASD are related to the size of the intracardiac shunt. Individuals with a larger shunt tend to present with symptoms at a younger age.

Adults with an uncorrected ASD present with symptoms of dyspnea on exertion (shortness of breath with minimal exercise), congestive heart failure, or cerebrovascular accident (stroke). They may be noted on routine testing to have an abnormal chest X-ray or an abnormal ECG and may have atrial fibrillation. If the ASD causes a left-to-right shunt, the pulmonary vasculature in both lungs may appear dilated on chest X-ray, due to the increase in pulmonary blood flow.

=== Physical examination ===
The physical findings in an adult with an ASD include those related directly to the intracardiac shunt and those that are secondary to the right heart failure that may be present in these individuals.

In unaffected individuals, respiratory variations occur in the splitting of the second heart sound (S_{2}). During respiratory inspiration, the negative intrathoracic pressure causes increased blood return into the right side of the heart. The increased blood volume in the right ventricle causes the pulmonic valve to stay open longer during ventricular systole. This causes a normal delay in the P_{2} component of S_{2}. During expiration, the positive intrathoracic pressure causes decreased blood return to the right side of the heart. The reduced volume in the right ventricle allows the pulmonic valve to close earlier at the end of ventricular systole, causing P_{2} to occur earlier.

In individuals with an ASD, a fixed splitting of S_{2} occurs because the extra blood return during inspiration gets equalized between the left and right atria due to the communication that exists between the atria in individuals with ASD.

The right ventricle can be thought of as continuously overloaded because of the left-to-right shunt, producing a widely split S2. Because the atria are linked via the atrial septal defect, inspiration produces no net pressure change between them, and has no effect on the splitting of S2. Thus, S2 is split to the same degree during inspiration as expiration, and is said to be "fixed".

=== Echocardiography ===
In transthoracic echocardiography, an atrial septal defect may be seen on color flow imaging as a jet of blood from the left atrium to the right atrium.

If agitated saline is injected into a peripheral vein during echocardiography, small air bubbles can be seen on echocardiographic imaging. Bubbles traveling across an ASD may be seen either at rest or during a cough, the flow of the bubbles indicates the direction of shunting. Because better visualization of the atria is achieved with transesophageal echocardiography, this test may be performed in individuals with a suspected ASD which is not visualized on transthoracic imaging. Newer techniques to visualize these defects involve intracardiac imaging with special catheters typically placed in the venous system and advanced to the level of the heart. This type of imaging is becoming more common and involves only mild sedation for the patient typically.

If the individual has adequate echocardiographic windows, use of the echocardiogram to measure the cardiac output of the left ventricle and the right ventricle independently is possible. In this way, the shunt fraction can be estimated using echocardiography.

=== Transcranial doppler bubble study ===
A less invasive method for detecting a PFO or other ASDs than transesophagal ultrasound is transcranial Doppler with bubble contrast. This method reveals the cerebral impact of the ASD or PFO.

=== Electrocardiogram ===
The ECG findings in atrial septal defect vary with the type of defect the individual has. Individuals with atrial septal defects may have a prolonged PR interval (a first-degree heart block). The prolongation of the PR interval is probably due to the enlargement of the atria common in ASDs and the increased distance due to the defect itself. Both of these can cause an increased distance of internodal conduction from the SA node to the AV node.

In addition to the PR prolongation, individuals with a primum ASD have a left axis deviation of the QRS complex, while those with a secundum ASD have a right axis deviation of the QRS complex. Individuals with a sinus venosus ASD exhibit a left axis deviation of the P wave (not the QRS complex).

A common finding in the ECG is the presence of incomplete right bundle branch block, which is so characteristic that if it is absent, the diagnosis of ASD should be reconsidered.

ASD with pulmonary embolism resulting in a right-to-left shunting of blood

== Treatment ==
=== Patent foramen ovale ===
Most patients with a PFO are asymptomatic and do not require any specific treatment. However, those who develop a stroke require further workup to identify the etiology. In those where a comprehensive evaluation is performed and an obvious etiology is not identified, they are defined as having a cryptogenic stroke. The mechanism for stroke is such individuals is likely embolic due to paradoxical emboli, a left atrial appendage clot, a clot on the inter-atrial septum, or within the PFO tunnel.

==== PFO closure ====
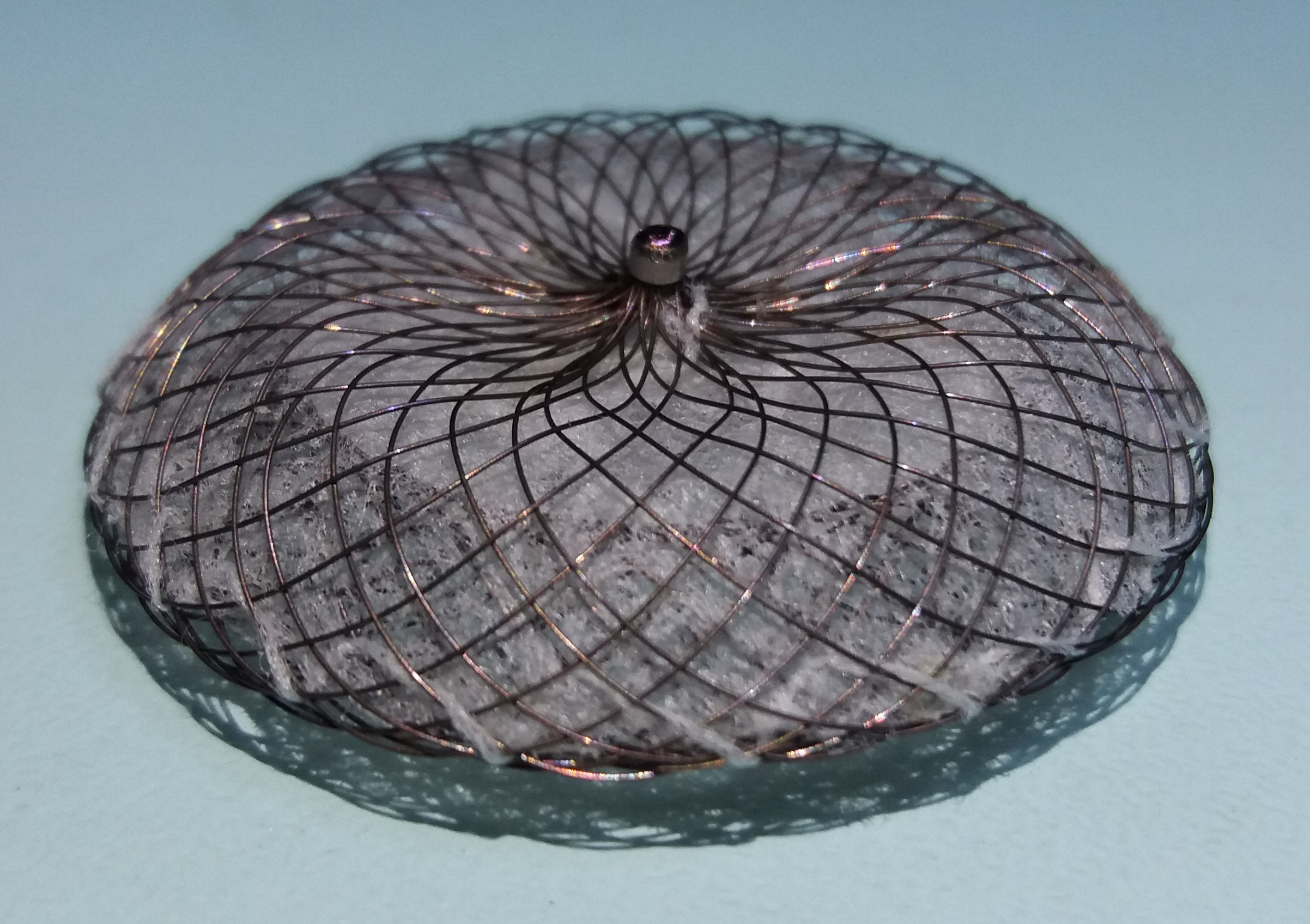
The Amplatzer Septal Occluder is a device specifically designed to close an ASD

Until recently, patients with PFO and cryptogenic stroke were treated with antiplatelet therapy only. Previous studies did not identify a clear benefit of PFO closure over antiplatelet therapy in reducing recurrent ischemic stroke. However, based on new evidence and systematic review in the field, percutaneous PFO closure in addition to antiplatelet therapy is suggested for all who meet all the following criteria:

- Age ≤ 60 years at onset of first stroke,
- Embolic-appearing cryptogenic ischemic stroke (i.e., no evident source of stroke despite a comprehensive evaluation), and
- PFO with a right-to-left interatrial shunt detected by bubble study (echocardiogram)

A variety of PFO closure devices may be implanted via catheter-based procedures.

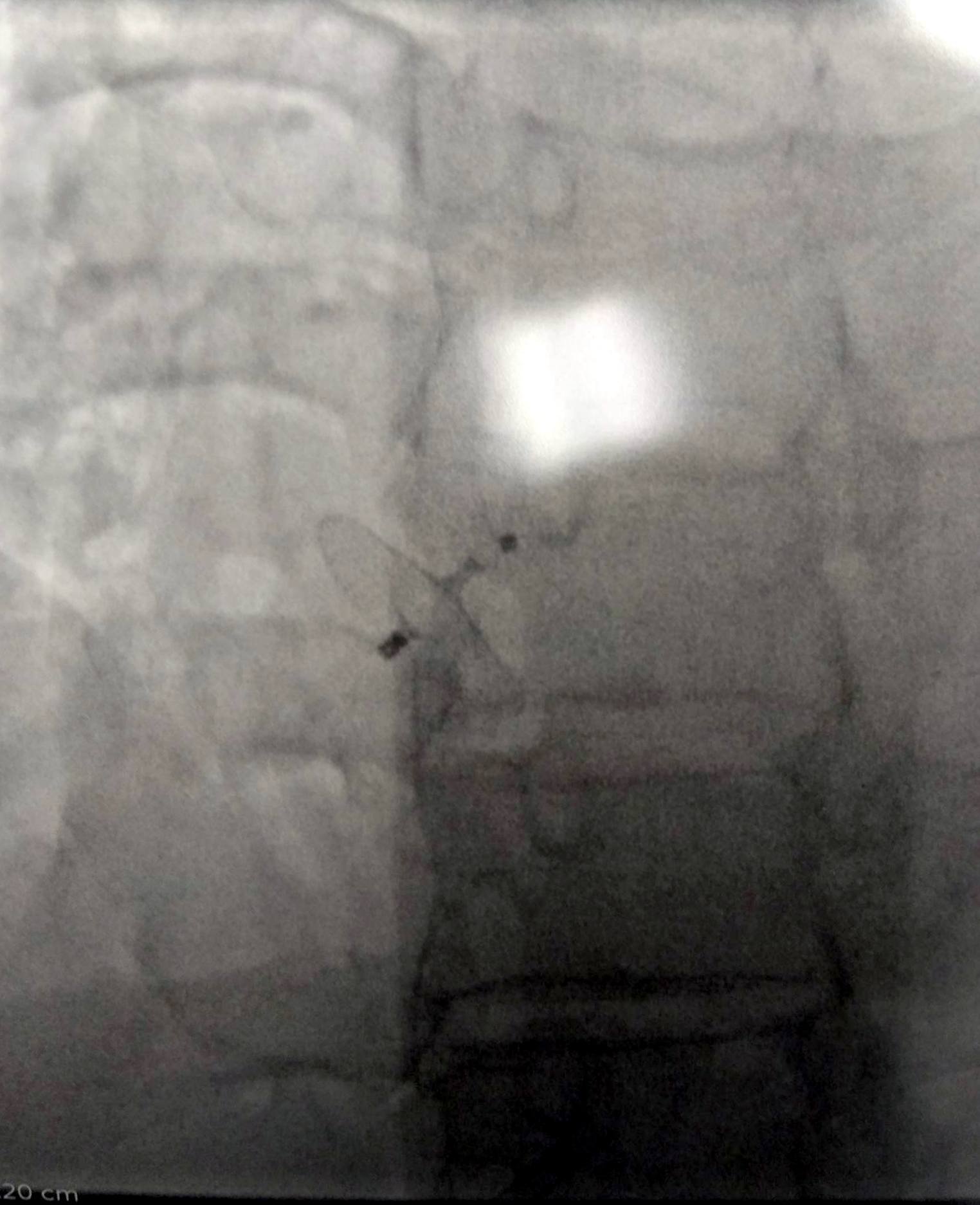
Amplatzer PFO Occluder in heart

==== Medical therapy ====
Based on the most up to date evidence, PFO closure is more effective at reducing recurrent ischemic stroke when compared to medical therapy. In most of these studies, antiplatelet and anticoagulation were combined in the medical therapy arm. Although there is limited data on the effectiveness of anticoagulation in reducing stroke in this population, it is hypothesized that based on the embolic mechanism, that anticoagulation should be superior to antiplatelet therapy at reducing risk of recurrent stroke. A recent review of the literature supports this hypothesis recommending anticoagulation over the use of antiplatelet therapy in patients with PFO and cryptogenic stroke. However, more evidence is required comparing of PFO closure with anticoagulation or anticoagulation with antiplatelet therapy.

=== Atrial septal defect ===
Once someone is found to have an atrial septal defect, a determination of whether it should be corrected is typically made. If the atrial septal defect is causing the right ventricle to enlarge a secundum atrial septal defect should generally be closed. If the ASD is not causing problems the defect may simply be checked every two or three years. Methods of closure of an ASD include surgical closure and percutaneous closure.

==== Evaluation prior to correction ====
Prior to correction of an ASD, an evaluation is made of the severity of the individual's pulmonary hypertension (if present at all) and whether it is reversible (closure of an ASD may be recommended for prevention purposes, to avoid such a complication in the first place. Pulmonary hypertension is not always present in adults who are diagnosed with an ASD in adulthood).

If pulmonary hypertension is present, the evaluation may include a right heart catheterization. This involves placing a catheter in the venous system of the heart and measuring pressures and oxygen saturations in the superior vena cava, inferior vena cava, right atrium, right ventricle, and pulmonary artery, and in the wedge position. Individuals with a pulmonary vascular resistance (PVR) less than 7 wood units show regression of symptoms (including NYHA functional class). However, individuals with a PVR greater than 15 wood units have increased mortality associated with closure of the ASD.

If the pulmonary arterial pressure is more than two-thirds of the systemic systolic pressure, a net left-to-right shunt should occur at least 1.5:1 or evidence of reversibility of the shunt when given pulmonary artery vasodilators prior to surgery. (If Eisenmenger's physiology has set in, the right-to-left shunt must be shown to be reversible with pulmonary artery vasodilators prior to surgery.)

Surgical mortality due to closure of an ASD is lowest when the procedure is performed prior to the development of significant pulmonary hypertension. The lowest mortality rates are achieved in individuals with a pulmonary artery systolic pressure less than 40 mmHg. If Eisenmenger's syndrome has occurred, a significant risk of mortality exists regardless of the method of closure of the ASD. In individuals who have developed Eisenmenger's syndrome, the pressure in the right ventricle has raised high enough to reverse the shunt in the atria. If the ASD is then closed, the afterload that the right ventricle has to act against has suddenly increased. This may cause immediate right ventricular failure, since it may not be able to pump the blood against the pulmonary hypertension.

==== Surgical closure ====
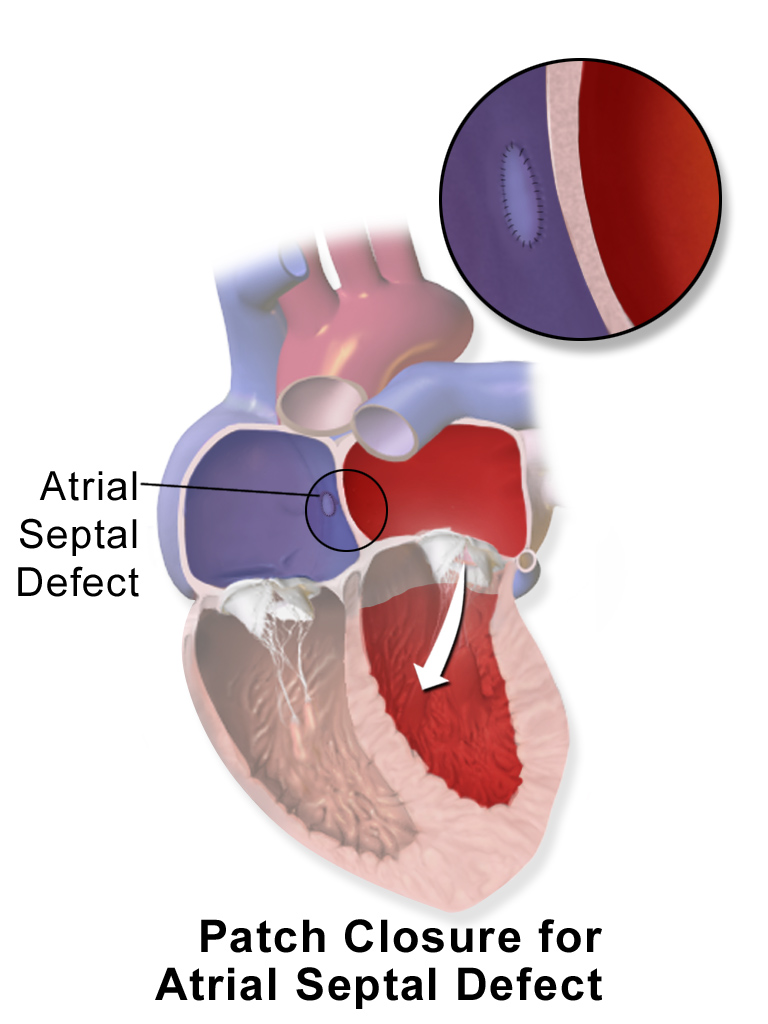
Illustration depicting surgical patch closure of ASD

Surgical closure of an ASD involves opening up at least one atrium and closing the defect with a patch under direct visualization.

==== Catheter procedure ====
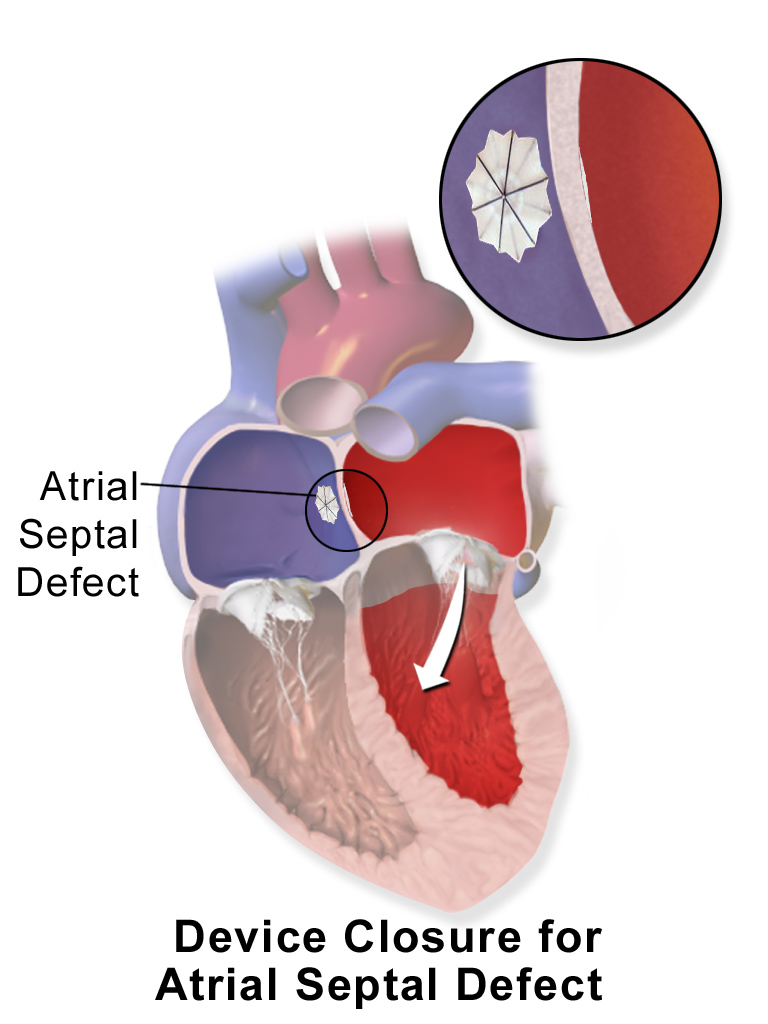
Illustration depicting surgical device closure of ASD

Percutaneous device closure involves the passage of a catheter into the heart through the femoral vein guided by fluoroscopy and echocardiography. An example of a percutaneous device is a device which has discs that can expand to a variety of diameters at the end of the catheter. The catheter is placed in the right femoral vein and guided into the right atrium. The catheter is guided through the atrial septal wall and one disc (left atrial) is opened and pulled into place. Once this occurs, the other disc (right atrial) is opened in place and the device is inserted into the septal wall. This type of PFO closure is more effective than drug or other medical therapies for decreasing the risk of future thromboembolism. The most common adverse effect of PFO device closure is new-onset atrial fibrillation. Other complications, all rare, include device migration, erosion and embolization and device thrombosis or formation of an inflammatory mass with risk for recurrent ischemic stroke.

Percutaneous closure of an ASD is currently only indicated for the closure of secundum ASDs with a sufficient rim of tissue around the septal defect so that the closure device does not impinge upon the superior vena cava, inferior vena cava, or the tricuspid or mitral valves. The Amplatzer Septal Occluder (ASO) is commonly used to close ASDs. The ASO consists of two self-expandable round discs connected to each other with a 4-mm waist, made up of 0.004– to 0.005-inch Nitinol wire mesh filled with Dacron fabric. Implantation of the device is relatively easy. The prevalence of residual defect is low. The disadvantages are a thick profile of the device and concern related to a large amount of nitinol (a nickel-titanium compound) in the device and consequent potential for nickel toxicity.

Percutaneous closure is the method of choice in most centres. Studies evaluating percutaneous ASD closure among pediatric and adult population show that this is relatively safer procedure and has better outcomes with increasing hospital volume.

== Epidemiology ==
As a group, atrial septal defects are detected in one child per 1500 live births. PFOs are quite common (appearing in 10–20% of adults), but when asymptomatic go undiagnosed. ASDs make up 30 to 40% of all congenital heart diseases that are seen in adults.

The ostium secundum atrial septal defect accounts for 7% of all congenital heart lesions. This lesion shows a male:female ratio of 1:2.
