= Familial isolated vitamin E deficiency =

Familial isolated vitamin e deficiency
- Other names: Ataxia With Vitamin E Deficiency
- Familial isolated vitamin E deficiency has an autosomal recessive pattern of inheritance.
- Specialty: Neurology
- Treatment: high-dose oral vitamin E supplementation

Familial isolated vitamin E deficiency or Ataxia with vitamin E deficiency (AVED) is a rare autosomal recessive neurodegenerative disease. Symptoms are similar to those of Friedreich ataxia.

== Cause ==
Familial isolated vitamin E deficiency is caused by mutations in TTPA, the gene for a-tocopherol transfer protein. Symptoms manifest late childhood to early teens.

== Treatment ==
Treatment includes Vitamin E therapy, where lifelong high-dose oral vitamin E supplementation is prescribed to maintain plasma vitamin E concentrations and monitoring vitamin E levels in blood plasma.

== See also ==
- Vitamin E deficiency
