= Ventricular extrasystoles with syncopal episodes-perodactyly-Robin sequence syndrome =

- Other names: Ventricular extrasystoles with syncope, perodactyly, and Robin sequence, Stoll-Kieny-Dott syndrome, Ventricular extrasystoles perodactyly Robin sequence
- Specialty: Medical genetics
- Usual onset: Birth and Childhood
- Causes: Genetic mutation
- Prevention: none
- Frequency: rare
- Deaths: -

Ventricular extrasystoles with syncopal episodes-perodactyly-Robin sequence syndrome is a rare autosomal dominant genetic disorder characterized by cardiofaciodigital anomalies occurring alongside Pierre Robin sequence. Additional features include abnormal sense of smell, camptodactyly, recurrent joint dislocations, and short stature. Around 6 to 12 cases have been described in medical literature.

This condition has also been called heart-hand syndrome type 5.

== Cases ==
This condition was first discovered in 1992 by Stoll et al, when they described 6 members belonging to a 3-generation French family. They had ventricular extrasystoles that presented itself with syncopal episodes associated with multifocal tachycardia, aplastic/hypoplastic distal phalanges of the toes (a phenomenon Stoll et al. described as perodactyly), Pierre Robin Sequence, a condition which causes symptoms such as glossoptosis, and down-slanting palpebral fissures (which Stoll et al. described as antimongoloid slanted). One instance of male-to-male transmission was seen in the family.

In 2008, Mercer et al. described 5 cases from 2 families. The first case was from a 7-year-old English girl who was brought to a doctor visit after she had a syncopal episode (also known as fainting) while swimming. Physical examination showed that she had similar symptoms to those shown by the French family reported by Stoll et al. The second to fifth cases were from 4 members of a 2-generation English family (a woman, her brother, and her two sons), alongside the typical symptoms of the syndrome, they also had other dysmorphic features such as a straight, pointy nose and prominent interphalangeal joints. Out of the 4 patients, 3 had hypodontia, 2 had multiple ventricular extrasystoles that weren't associated with syncopal episodes, 2 had microcephaly, the same 2 patients had a low anterior hairline, and the same 2 patients had mild learning difficulties. These last 2 cases (with microcephaly, low anterior hairline and learning difficulties) were from the brothers, they attended a special education school. While the mother didn't have any learning difficulties and had average intelligence, she did report having had difficulties with school during her academic years. A follow-up on the family was reported by Pengelly et al in the year 2016: one of the 2 brothers went on to have a daughter who reportedly had additional multiple congenital anomalies/dysmorphic features which neither of the brothers had been reported of having, including agenesis of the first metacarpal, a mild form of developmental delay, speech delay, long philtrum, short nasal bridge, thin upper lip, epicanthic folds, radial agenesis of the right arm, thumb hypoplasia, and various benign septal defects (of the heart) which were deemed to be harmless. Genetic testing revealed that all 5 family members that had once been reported as having Stoll syndrome had a mutation in their TRIO gene, which indicated that they had a separate disorder known as autosomal dominant intellectual disability-44 with microcephaly

=== Autosomal dominant intellectual disability-44 with microcephaly ===
This is a condition with only around 25 cases described in medical history (including the previously mentioned family), it's characterized by mild intellectual disability and developmental delay, microcephaly, digital anomalies, and facial dysmorphisms. It is associated with heterozygous mutations in the TRIO gene.
