= Ventricular septal defect =

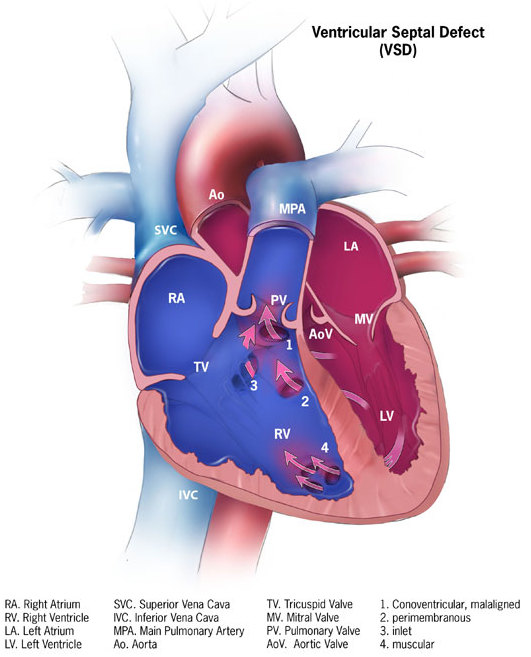
- Illustration showing various forms of ventricular septal defects.: 1. Conoventricular, malaligned 2. Perimembranous; 3. Inlet; 4. Muscular
- Specialty: Cardiac surgery
- Frequency: 0.0272% (Europe)

Heart sounds of a ventricular septal defect in a 14-year-old girl.

A ventricular septal defect (VSD) is a hole in the ventricular septum, the wall dividing the left and right ventricles of the heart. It is a common congenital heart defect, although restrictive muscular VSDs are not true pathological defects; they are typically just a delayed closure of the ventricular septum. They have an extremely high prevalence in newborns. The extent of the opening may vary from pin size to complete absence of the ventricular septum, creating one common ventricle. The ventricular septum consists of an inferior muscular and superior membranous portion and is extensively innervated with conducting cardiomyocytes.

The membranous portion, which is close to the atrioventricular node, is most commonly affected in adults and older children in the United States. It is also the type that will most commonly require surgical intervention, comprising over 80% of cases.

New research has found that muscular ventricular septal defects are more common than membranous ventricular septal defects, and are the most common congenital cardiac anomaly. Around 3-5% of newborn babies have small muscular VSDs, according to the Copenhagen Baby Heart Study.

== Signs and symptoms ==
Ventricular septal defect is usually symptomless at birth. It usually manifests a few weeks after birth.

VSD is an acyanotic congenital heart defect, AKA a left-to-right shunt, so there are no signs of cyanosis in the early stage. However, an uncorrected VSD can increase pulmonary resistance leading to the reversal of the shunt and to corresponding cyanosis.

- Pansystolic (Holosystolic) murmur along lower left sternal border (depending upon the size of the defect) +/- palpable thrill (palpable turbulence of blood flow). Heart sounds are normal. Larger VSDs may cause a parasternal heave, a displaced apex beat (the palpable heartbeat moves laterally over time, as the heart enlarges). An infant with a large VSD will fail to thrive and become sweaty and tachypnoeic (breathe faster) with feeds.

The restrictive ventricular septal defects (smaller defects) are associated with a louder murmur and more palpable thrill (grade IV murmur). Larger defects may eventually be associated with pulmonary hypertension due to the increased blood flow. Over time this may lead to an Eisenmenger's syndrome the original VSD operating with a left-to-right shunt, now becomes a right-to-left shunt because of the increased pressures in the pulmonary vascular bed.

== Cause ==
Congenital VSDs are frequently associated with other congenital conditions, such as Down syndrome. Congenital heart disease, particularly VSDs, is the number one cause of death for children with Down syndrome ages birth to two.

A VSD can also form a few days after a myocardial infarction (heart attack) due to mechanical tearing of the septal wall, before scar tissue forms, when macrophages start remodeling the dead heart tissue.

A congenital VSD can result from a disturbance in the morphogenesis of the heart in its embryonic stages. In the fifth week of gestation, the heart undergoes multiple processes of septation and forming a dextral loop. Interfering with the latter leads to insufficient leftward movement of the ventricular outflow tract over the atrioventricular canal, which in turn can result in a VSD or, in the most extreme cases, a double outlet right ventricle with one.

A ventricular septal defect arises when the superior part of the interventricular septum, which separates the right and left ventricles of the heart, fails to fully develop. The right ventricle pumps blood to the lungs to get oxygen, while the left ventricle pumps blood to the rest of the body to provide oxygen to tissues. A ventricular septal defect results in the mixing of oxygen-rich blood with oxygen-poor blood, increasing strain on the heart and lungs.

== Pathophysiology ==
During ventricular contraction, or systole, some of the blood from the left ventricle leaks into the right ventricle, passes through the lungs and re-enters the left ventricle via the pulmonary veins and left atrium. This has two net effects. First, the circuitous refluxing of blood causes volume overload on the left ventricle. Second, because the left ventricle normally has a much higher systolic pressure (~120 mmHg) than the right ventricle (~20 mmHg), the leakage of blood into the right ventricle therefore elevates right ventricular pressure and volume, causing pulmonary hypertension with its associated symptoms.

In serious cases, the pulmonary arterial pressure can reach levels that equal the systemic pressure. This reverses the left to right shunt, so that blood then flows from the right ventricle into the left ventricle, resulting in cyanosis, as blood is by-passing the lungs for oxygenation.

This effect is more noticeable in patients with larger defects, who may present with breathlessness, poor feeding and failure to thrive in infancy. Patients with smaller defects may be asymptomatic. Four different septal defects exist, with perimembranous most common, outlet, atrioventricular, and muscular less commonly.

== Diagnosis ==
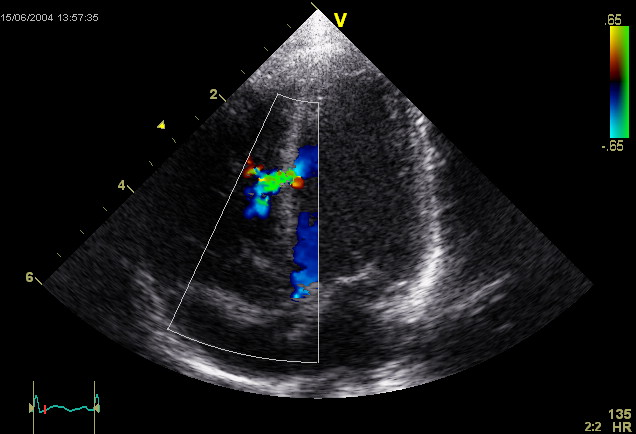
Echocardiographic image of a moderate ventricular septal defect in the mid-muscular part of the septum. The trace in the lower left shows the flow during one complete cardiac cycle and the red mark the time in the cardiac cycle that the image was captured. Colours are used to represent the velocity of the blood. Flow is from the left ventricle (right on image) to the right ventricle (left on image). The size and position is typical for a VSD in the newborn period.

A VSD can be detected by cardiac auscultation. Classically, a VSD causes a pathognomonic holo- or pansystolic murmur. Auscultation is generally considered sufficient for detecting a significant VSD. The murmur depends on the abnormal flow of blood from the left ventricle, through the VSD, to the right ventricle. If there is not much difference in pressure between the left and right ventricles, then the flow of blood through the VSD will not be very great and the VSD may be silent. This situation occurs a) in the fetus (when the right and left ventricular pressures are essentially equal), b) for a short time after birth (before the right ventricular pressure has decreased), and c) as a late complication of unrepaired VSD. Confirmation of cardiac auscultation can be obtained by non-invasive cardiac ultrasound (echocardiography). To more accurately measure ventricular pressures, cardiac catheterization, can be performed.

=== Classification ===
Although there are several classifications for VSD, the most accepted and unified classification is that of Congenital Heart Surgery Nomenclature and Database Project. The classification is based on the location of the VSD on the right ventricular surface of the inter ventricular septum and is as follows:

==== Type 1 ====
Type 1 is sub aortic

==== Type 2 ====
- Type 2 also known as perimembranous, paramembranous, conoventricular, membranous septal defect, and subaortic.
- Most common variety found in 70%

==== Type 3 ====
Type 3 also known as inlet (or AV canal type).

- Commonly associated with atrioventricular septal defect, found in about 5%

==== Type 4 ====
Type 4 also known as muscular (trabecular)

- Located in the muscular septum, found in 20%. Can be sub classified again based on the location into anterior, apical, posterior and mid

==== Type: Gerbode ====
Type: Gerbode also known as left ventricular to right atrial communication

- Due to absence of Atrioventricular septum.
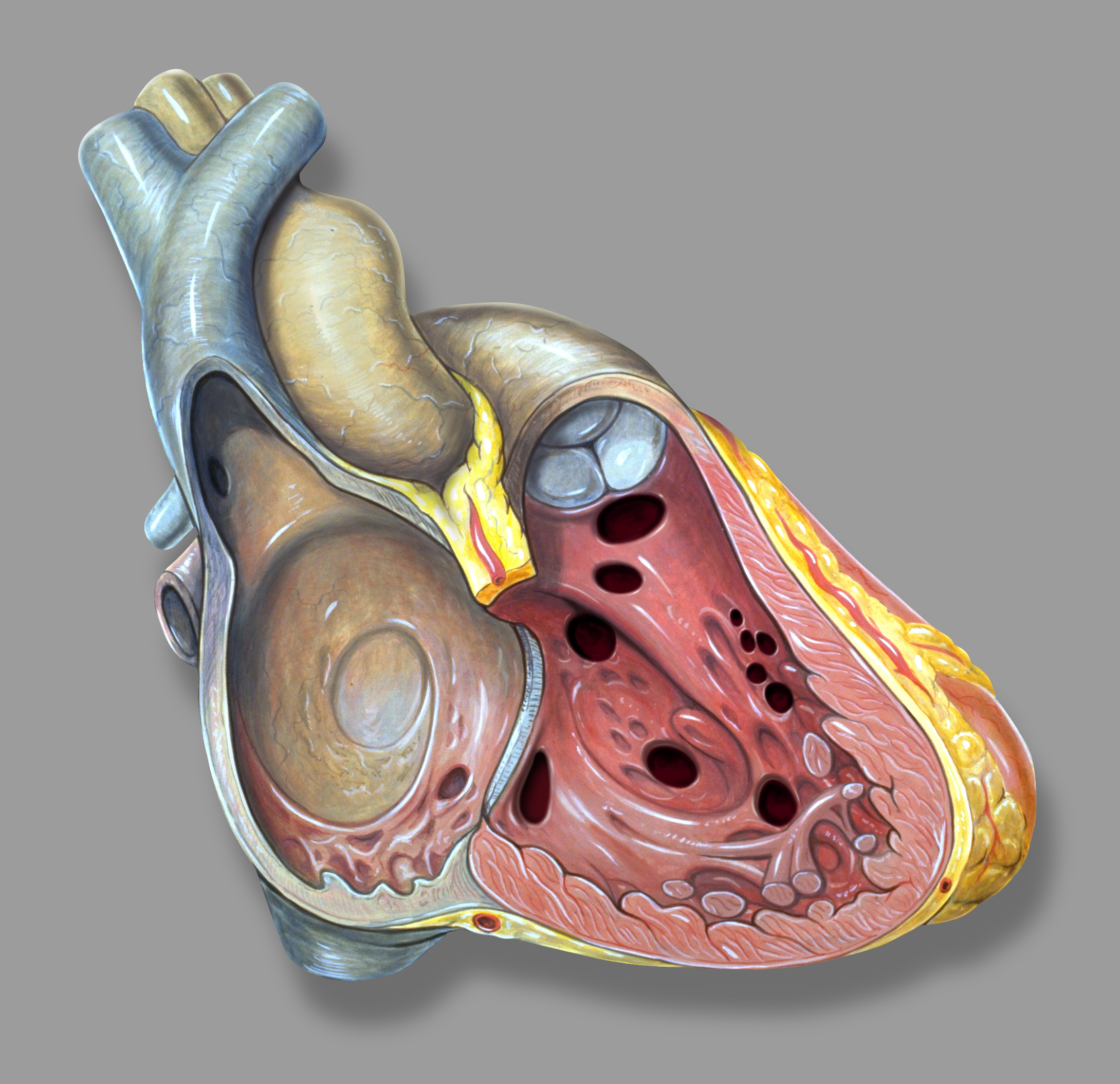
Heart anatomic view of right ventricle and right atrium with example ventricular septal defects

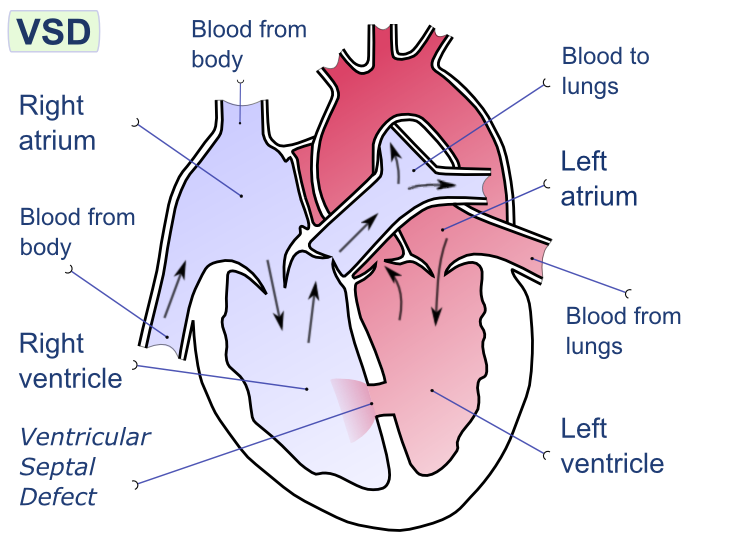
Ventricular septal defect

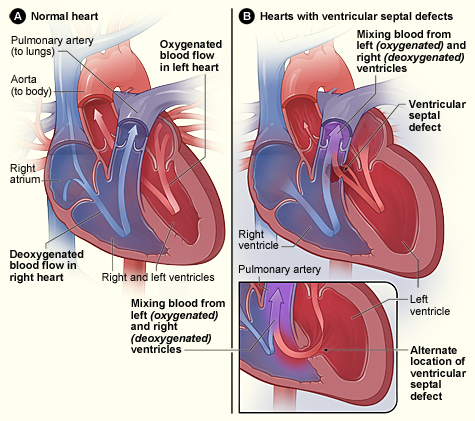
Figure A shows the structure and blood flow in the interior of a normal heart. Figure B shows two common locations for a ventricular septal defect. The defect allows oxygen-rich blood from the left ventricle to mix with oxygen-poor blood in the right ventricle.

== Treatment ==
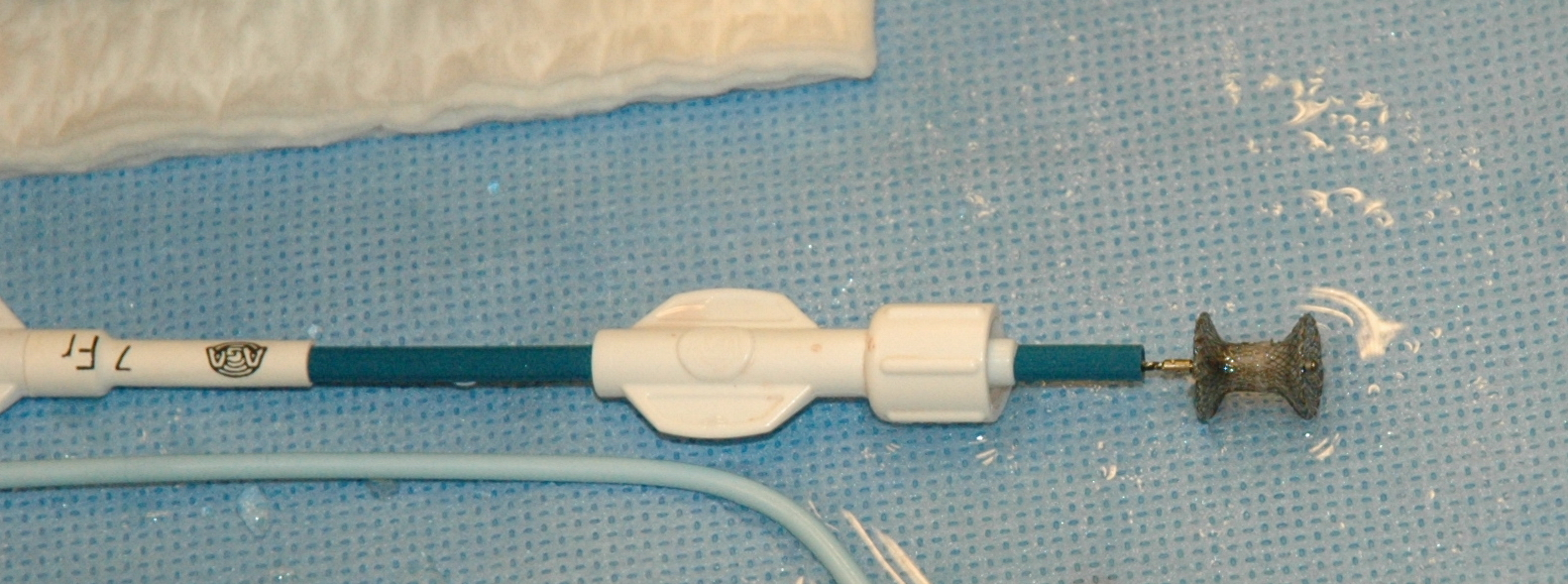
A nitinol device for closing muscular VSDs, 4 mm diameter in the centre. It is shown mounted on the catheter into which it will be withdrawn during insertion.

Most cases do not need treatment and heal during the first years of life. Treatment is either conservative or surgical. Smaller congenital VSDs often close on their own, as the heart grows, and in such cases may be treated conservatively. Some cases may necessitate surgical intervention, i.e. with the following indications:

1. Failure of congestive cardiac failure to respond to medications
2. VSD with pulmonic stenosis
3. Large VSD with pulmonary hypertension
4. VSD with aortic regurgitation

For the surgical procedure, a heart-lung machine is required and a median sternotomy is performed. Percutaneous endovascular procedures are less invasive and can be done on a beating heart, but are only suitable for certain patients. Repair of most VSDs is complicated by the fact that the conducting system of the heart is in the immediate vicinity.

Ventricular septum defect in infants is initially treated medically with cardiac glycosides (e.g., digoxin 10–20 μg/kg per day), loop diuretics (e.g., furosemide 1–3 mg/kg per day) and ACE inhibitors (e.g., captopril 0.5–2 mg/kg per day).

=== Transcatheter closure ===
A device, known as the Amplatzer muscular VSD occluder, may be used to close certain VSDs. It was initially approved in 2009. It appears to work well and be safe. The cost is also lower than having open heart surgery. The device is placed through a small incision in the groin.

The Amplatzer septal occluder was shown to have full closure of the ventricular defect within the 24 hours of placement. It has a low risk of embolism after implantation. Some tricuspid valve regurgitation was shown after the procedure that could possibly be from the right ventricular disc. There have been some reports that the Amplatzer septal occluder may cause life-threatening erosion of the tissue inside the heart. This occurs in one percent of people implanted with the device and requires immediate open-heart surgery. This erosion occurs due to improper sizing of the device resulting with it being too large for the defect, causing rubbing of the septal tissue and erosion.

=== Surgery ===
Surgical closure of a perimembranous VSD is performed on cardiopulmonary bypass with ischemic arrest. Patients are usually cooled to 28 degrees. Percutaneous Device closure of these defects is rarely performed in the United States because of the reported incidence of both early and late onset complete heart block after device closure, presumably secondary to device trauma to the AV node.

Surgical exposure is achieved through the right atrium. The tricuspid valve septal leaflet is retracted or incised to expose the defect margins.

Several patch materials are available, including native pericardium, bovine pericardium, PTFE (Gore-Tex or Impra), or Dacron.

Suture techniques include horizontal pledgeted mattress sutures, and running polypropylene suture.

Critical attention is necessary to avoid injury to the conduction system located on the left ventricular side of the interventricular septum near the papillary muscle of the conus. Care is taken to avoid injury to the aortic valve with sutures.

Once the repair is complete, the heart is extensively deaired by venting blood through the aortic cardioplegia site, and by infusing Carbon Dioxide into the operative field to displace air.

Intraoperative transesophageal echocardiography is used to confirm secure closure of the VSD, normal function of the aortic and tricuspid valves, good ventricular function, and the elimination of all air from the left side of the heart.

The sternum, fascia and skin are closed, with potential placement of a local anesthetic infusion catheter under the fascia, to enhance postoperative pain control.

Multiple muscular VSDs are a challenge to close, achieving a complete closure can be aided by the use of fluorescein dye.

== Epidemiology ==
VSDs are the most common congenital cardiac abnormalities. They are found in 30–60% of all newborns with a congenital heart defect, or about 2–6 per 1000 births. During heart formation, when the heart begins life as a hollow tube, it begins to partition, forming septa. If this does not occur properly it can lead to an opening being left within the ventricular septum. It is debatable whether all those defects are true heart defects, or if some of them are normal phenomena, since most of the trabecular VSDs close spontaneously. Prospective studies give a prevalence of 2–5 per 100 births of trabecular VSDs that close shortly after birth in 80–90% of the cases.

== Famous people who had ventricular septal defect ==
- Madhubala (1933–69), Indian actress. Died at age 36.
- XXXTentacion (1998–2018), American rapper and singer-songwriter. Murdered aged 20
- Asa Hartford (born 1950), still alive

== See also ==
- Atrial septal defect
- Atrioventricular septal defect
- Cardiac output
- Congenital heart disease
- Heart sounds
- Pulmonary hypertension
