= Transcatheter pulmonary valve replacement =

Replacement of the pulmonary valve via catheterization through the femoral vein

- Other names: TPVR, percutaneous pulmonary valve implantation (PPVI)
- Specialty: Interventional cardiology
- Uses: Congenital defects of the right ventricular outflow tract, failing artificial valves
- Complications: Stent fracture, infective endocarditis
- Other options: Open heart surgery
- Outcomes: 92%-98% successful implantation

Transcatheter pulmonary valve replacement (TPVR), also known as percutaneous pulmonary valve implantation (PPVI), is the replacement of the pulmonary valve via catheterization through a vein. It is a significantly less invasive procedure in comparison to open heart surgery and is commonly used to treat conditions such as pulmonary atresia.

== Uses ==
TPVR can be used to repair congenital defects in the pulmonary valve or right ventricular outflow tract dysfunction, such as pulmonary atresia, Tetralogy of Fallot, or persistent truncus arteriosus. TPVR can also be used to replace dysfunctional artificial heart valves.

For those experiencing symptoms, TPVR is indicated when the right ventricular systolic pressure is above 60 mmHg and/or when there is moderate to severe pulmonary regurgitation. For those not experiencing any symptoms, TPVR is indicated if there is severe right ventricular outflow tract narrowing and/or severe pulmonary insufficiency, with decreased exercise capacity, progressive right ventricular dilation, progressive right ventricular dysfunction, progressive tricuspid valve regurgitation, right ventricular systolic pressure above 80 mmHg, or cardiac fibrillation.

For dysfunctional artificial conduits, TPVR immediately resolves pulmonary regurgitation and normalizes the right ventricular outflow tract gradient, and is associated with significant improvements in symptoms and improvements in long-term ventricular function.

== Contraindications ==
Active infection, central vein occlusion, coronary occlusion, and need for other surgeries such as for arrhythmia are contraindications for TPVR.

If coronary compression (which impairs coronary blood flow) is observed with balloon dilation in the right ventricular outflow tract, TPVR is also contraindicated. This test is performed to prevent potentially fatal complications, for which approximately 5% of candidates are at risk.

TPVR is not recommended for tracts that are less than 16 mm or more than 29 mm in diameter.

== Complications ==
There is a low incidence of major complications, which is likely due to pre-procedural assessments preventing individuals with unfavourable anatomy from undergoing the procedure.

The most common complication is fracture of the stent frame. This is seen in up to 30% of cases. The majority of stent fractures are diagnosed by routine imaging and are not clinically relevant. Stent fractures leading to obstruction of the right ventricular outflow tract is the most common reason for repeat intervention and can be treated with valve-in-valve procedures (placing a new valve inside the failed valve). More severe fractures may require surgery. Risk factors for stent fractures include younger age, smaller tract diameter, and position of the valve directly below the sternum.

Tears or ruptures of the right ventricular outflow tract may occur during the procedure, especially if the tract is already heavily calcified. This is reported to occur in up to 9% of procedures. Most cases are manageable by using a covered stent and do not lead to severe bleeding.

Infective endocarditis occurs at a rate of about 1%-3%. Most cases do not directly impact the implanted valve, and most cases can be treated with antibiotics. However, infective endocarditis can also cause valve explantation or sepsis, which can lead to death.

Rare complications that may require urgent surgery include valve migration, valve embolization, pulmonary artery occlusion, pulmonary artery rupture, or coronary artery compression impeding blood flow.

Death is rare, and is usually attributable to other comorbidities rather than from the implantation procedure itself.

== Procedure ==
=== Pre-procedural assessment ===
Several tests are performed before the procedure to assess whether the procedure is suitable for the individual and to record their anatomy in preparation for the procedure. Ventricular function and size are assessed with an echocardiogram. The right ventricle and the anatomy of the outflow tract, including any anatomical variations, are also assessed with cardiac magnetic resonance imaging. The severity of the outflow tract defect or pulmonary regurgitation is assessed with Doppler ultrasonography.

=== Operation ===
TPVR is a percutaneous procedure, meaning the device is brought into the body through the skin and into a vein. Patients are put under general anesthesia. The heart is typically reached by passing through the femoral vein, jugular vein, or subclavian vein. A balloon dilation test is performed first, to confirm that coronary compression will not occur and the procedure can continue. Stent fractures can be prevented by using pre-stenting, using a bare metal stent before TPVR. After the valve is implanted, balloon dilation is used to create the diameter of the valve. At the end of the procedure, pressure is applied to the area to encourage hemostasis (stop bleeding).

=== Recovery ===
Patients undergoing TPVR are typically ambulatory within 6 hours of finishing the procedure and can be discharged home within 24 hours. As cardiopulmonary bypass is not required, a stay in the intensive care unit and an extended hospital stay are generally not needed.

== History ==
TPVR was developed as a less invasive alternative to other treatment options requiring open heart surgery, such as patch augmentation, replacing the native valve with an artificial heart valve, or using a valved conduit. These surgeries typically require repeat surgeries to repair issues including pulmonary regurgitation, valve narrowing, kinking of the conduit, or calcification, leading to significant morbidity.

The first TPVR was performed in 2000. This device was further developed into the Melody transcatheter pulmonary valve by Medtronic. The Melody device received approval from Health Canada in 2006 and from the US Food and Drug Administration (FDA) in 2010. A similar device, the Edwards Sapien pulmonic transcatheter heart valve, produced by Edwards Lifesciences, first received FDA approval in 2015.

The comparatively lower risks of TPVR and reduced need for reintervention compared to traditional surgical treatments has led to a paradigm shift favouring earlier treatment for right ventricular outflow tract defects, which were previously postponed due to the risks of traditional surgery.

== See also ==
- Cardiac catheterization
- Percutaneous aortic valve replacement
