= Fallot =

Fallot is a French surname. Notable people called Fallot include:

- Arthur Fallot (1850–1911), French physician
- Gustave Fallot (1807–1836), French librarian and philologist
- Guy Fallot (1927–2018), French cellist born in Nancy
- Paul Fallot (1889–1960), French geologist and paleontologist
- Tommy Fallot (1844–1904), French pastor, founder of Christian socialism in France

== See also ==
- Microphthalmia diaphragmatic hernia Fallot, a class of rare congenital anomalies
- Tetralogy of Fallot (TOF), a congenital heart defect
- Trilogy of Fallot, a rare congenital heart disease
