= Trilogy of Fallot =

Congenital heart defect

- Other names: Fallot's trilogy, Fallot's triad
- Specialty: Cardiology
- Symptoms: Cyanosis, increased fatigue, frequent upper respiratory infection, clubbing
- Usual onset: From birth
- Duration: Lifetime, unless fixed by surgery
- Diagnostic method: Echocardiography, Angiography
- Differential diagnosis: Tetralogy of Fallot
- Treatment: Surgery
- Frequency: 1.2% of congenital heart defects

The Trilogy of Fallot, also called Fallot's trilogy, is a rare congenital heart disease consisting of the following defects: pulmonary valve stenosis, right ventricular hypertrophy, and atrial septal defect. It occurs in 1.2% of all congenital heart defects.

A 1960 case report of 22 patients who underwent surgery showed an excess of females with a ratio of 3:2, with the youngest person being 7 months old and the oldest being 50 years old.

== Symptoms and signs ==
History of 18 cyanotic patients from a 1960 case report
	No.
Cyanotic onset	
First year	8
1 to 10 year	6
Over 10 years	4
Increased fatigue	11
Frequent U.R.I	9
Dyspnea	7
Squatting	4
Syncope	3
Poor growth	2

Physical findings on 22 patients from a 1960 case report
Symptom	No.	%
Murmur at left base	22	100%
Diminished or absent pulmonary second sound	19	86%
Cyanosis	18	82%
Thrill at left base	13	59%
Clubbing	12	54%
Prominent A waves	11	50%
Right ventricular lift	9	40%
Chest deformity	4	18%

== Mechanism ==
Trilogy of Fallot is a combination of three congenital heart defects: pulmonary stenosis, right ventricular hypertrophy, and an atrial septal defect.

The first two of these are also found in the more common tetralogy of Fallot. However, the tetralogy has a ventricular septal defect instead of an atrial one, and it also involves an overriding aorta

Pulmonary valve stenosis

Right ventricular hypertrophy

=== The Three Malformations ===
Condition	Description
Pulmonary stenosis	A malformation near or on the pulmonary valve (the valve between the right ventricle and the pulmonary artery) that causes the opening of the valve to be narrowed, affecting blood flow. This narrowing can occur when one or more of the cusps is too thick or is otherwise defective, preventing the valve from opening fully and properly.
Right ventricular hypertrophy	The right ventricle is more muscular than normal, causing a characteristic boot-shaped appearance as seen by chest X-ray. This enlargement is generally a secondary condition, resulting from increased pressure. Pulmonary valve defects resulting in tricuspid regurgitation, a common effect of pulmonary stenosis, can cause this increase in muscle mass.
Atrial septal defect	An atrial septal defect is a hole in the septum that divides the right and left atria (the upper two chambers) of the heart. In the heart of a developing fetus, there are several holes between the atria, however these are expected to close before birth. This congenital condition arises if one of these holes remains. Depending on the severity of the defect, it may need to be repaired surgically, as a significant defect can cause further damage to the heart and lungs.

== Diagnosis ==
Diagnosis is done via echocardiography or angiography.

== Treatment ==
It is treated using surgery to repair the atrial septal defect and pulmonary stenosis, once the pulmonary stenosis has been fixed the right ventricular hypertrophy will usually go away on its own.

Balloon valvuloplasty is the most common treatment for pulmonary stenosis, a balloon is placed where the artery or valve is narrowed and is inflated, widening the artery or valve in the process, the balloon is then removed. It may cause valve regurgitation. If balloon valvuplasty is not an option open heart surgery must be performed where the valve is either repaired or replaced with an artificial one.

== History ==
It is named in honor of its discoverer: Etienne Fallot.
