= Pulmonary atresia with ventricular septal defect =

Type of congenital heart defect

- Other names: PA-VSDS (abbr.)
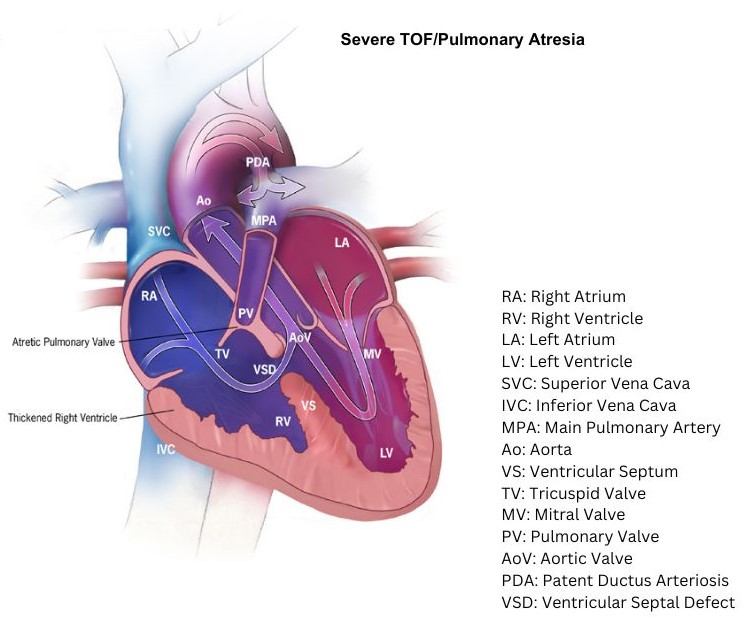
- Pulmonary atresia with ventricular septal defect
- Specialty: Medical genetics
- Risk factors: Genetic and environmental factors usually come into place
- Diagnostic method: Radiological studies such as chest CT scans.
- Differential diagnosis: Pulmonary atresia
- Prognosis: poor without treatment
- Frequency: rare
- Deaths: untreated PAVSD patients more likely to suffer from a premature death

Pulmonary atresia with ventricular septal defect is a rare birth defect characterized by pulmonary valve atresia occurring alongside a defect on the right ventricular outflow tract.

It is a type of congenital heart disease/defect, and one of the two recognized subtypes of pulmonary atresia, the other being pulmonary atresia with intact ventricular septum.

== Signs and symptoms ==
Heart sounds of a ventricular septal defect patient

The condition consists of atresia affecting the pulmonary valve and a hypoplastic right ventricular outflow tract. The ventricular septal defect doesn't impede the in and outflowing of blood in the ventricular septum, which helps it form during fetal life.

The spectrum of symptoms exhibited by children with this condition depends on the severity of the condition, while some barely show symptoms, others might develop complications such as congestive heart failure.

In symptomatic children, symptoms become apparent soon after birth, these usually consist of the following:

- Cyanosis
- Breathing difficulties
- Feeding difficulties
- Exhaustion while being fed
- Heart murmur
- Excessive daytime sleepiness
- Sticky skin

Other features can occur alongside this birth defect, including other congenital anomalies such as polydactyly, microcephaly, congenital hearing loss (sensorineural type), renal agenesis, dextrocardia, etc.

The condition has been called a severe form of Tetralogy of Fallot.

If deformed blood vessels coming from the thoracic aorta appear alongside this condition, the phenotype is renamed to pulmonary atresia with ventricular septal defect and major aortopulmonary collaterals.

== Complications ==
Children with this condition are at a higher risk of developing the following complications:

- Failure to thrive
- Recurrent chest infections
- Endocarditis
- Epilepsy
- Stroke
- Arrhythmia
- Heart failure
- Premature death

Children whose PAVSD is caused by DiGeorge syndrome (also known as 22q11.2 deletion syndrome) are more likely to suffer from the post-surgical complications (especially respiratory ones) associated with surgeries that treat this defect.

Women with PAVSD are at a slightly higher risk of being infertile and having miscarriages or children with a congenital heart defect.

Airway hyperresponsiveness is a commonly seen co-morbidity among those afflicted with PAVSD.

== Pathogenesis ==
Pulmonary atresia in PAVSD takes place during the first 8 weeks of fetal life, when the pulmonary valve that is supposed to form, fails to form, this doesn't allow blood to flow through the pulmonary artery from the right ventricle. The ventricular septal defect associated with PAVSD lets the right ventricule form.

In some cases of PAVSD, major aortopulmonary collateral arteries develop; in a normal fetus, these arteries usually develop but then start deteriorating after pulmonary arteries grow, in fetuses with PAVSD, the pulmonary arteries don't develop, and this gives a chance to the major aortopulmonary collateral arteries to develop fully.

== Pathophysiology ==
The mildest variant of pulmonary atresia with ventricular septal defect involves pulmonary atresia with normally developed main pulmonary artery and branch pulmonary arteries, the blood that flows to the lungs from the right side of the heart goes to the left side of the heart through the ventricular septum which then flows through the patent ductus arteriosus. The most severe variant involves the presence of severely hypoplastic main pulmonary arteries and branch pulmonary arteries, alongside agenesis of the patent ductus arteriosus. Blood flow to the lungs comes from various dysplastic (malformed) blood vessels from the thoracic aorta called major aortapulmonary collateral arteries, these blood vessels narrow down as time goes on.

== Causes ==
Although this birth defect is congenital, the exact cause is unknown, and it may vary between children with the condition, the following factors have been known to influence the risk of a baby being born with the condition:

=== Genetics ===
The molecular genetics of this condition isn't known in most people with PA(VSD), however, there have been candidate genes found to be possibly implicated in the pathogenesis of this condition:

- DNAH10
- DST
- FAT1
- HMCN1
- HNRNPC
- TEP1
- TYK2
- NDRG4
- TBX5
- NKX2.5
- GATA4

There have also been copy number variants described in the medical literature as associated with PA(VSD):

- Deletion in chromosome 16p11.2
- Deletion in chromosome 5q35.3
- Deletion in chromosome 5p13.1
- Deletion in chromosome 22q11.2
- Deletion in chromosome 15q11.2
- Deletion in chromosome 8p23.2
- Deletion in chromosome 17p13.2
- Duplication in chromosome 5q14.1
- Duplication in chromosome 10p13

A 1998 study done in Britain revealed that children with a mother who had a congenital heart defect (including PAVSD) had a higher risk of being born with a congenital heart defect themselves than those whose father had a congenital heart defect.

==== Syndromes ====
Some cases of PA(VSD) have been associated with genetic syndromes such as VACTERL association, Alagille syndrome, CHARGE syndrome, trisomy 13, 18, and 21.

=== Environmental ===
While congenital heart defects can't be acquired, they can also be caused by environmental factors the mother exposed herself to before and/or during pregnancy, these include:

- Smoking
- Certain medications (e.g. thalidomide, retinoids, or vitamin A coegers)
- Alcohol consumption
- Vehicle exhaust components
- By-products of disinfectants
- Incinerators (proximity)
- Agricultural pesticides
- Solvents
- Landfill sites
- Heavy metals

Maternal exposure to carbon monoxide from smoke (e.g. from cigarettes) has been known for having the ability of quickly crossing the placenta into the fetus, which then attaches itself to fetal hemoglobin, leaving a shortage of nutrients and oxygen as a result. A relation between these events and congenital heart disease (including PAVSD) has been showed in 3 recent meta-analyses.

Paternal smoking (that is, smoking by the father) has also been shown to be a contributing factor to congenital heart disease; while light smoking slightly increased the risk of the man's offspring having a (congenital) conotruncal heart defect, heavy smoking of more than 14 cigarettes a day doubled the risk for said man to have a child with congenital heart disease. Higher amounts than this were linked to a higher risk of having children with septal defects and/or obstruction of the left ventricular outflow tract.

Other risk factors include maternal obesity, diabetes, rubella, indomethacin tocolysis, phenylketonuria, or elderly age.

=== Multifactorial: involving genetic and environmental factors at the same time ===
A link between certain genes and maternal smoking has been shown to increase the chance of having children with congenital heart disease (including PAVSD): mothers who have a CC genotype at position 677 of the MTHFR gene have an increased chance of having a CHD-ridden child. Other genes that increase the chance of a child with CHD in smoker mothers who carry genetic variations in them include ERCC1, ERCC5, PARP2, and OSGEP.

== Diagnosis ==
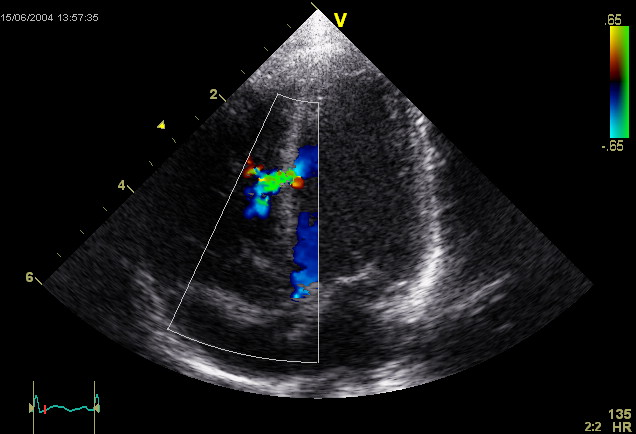
Ultrasound of ventricular septal defect

There are various ways of diagnosing this congenital heart defect both prenatally and postnatally, these methods include:

- Ultrasound
- Pulse oximetry
- Chest X-ray
- Echocardiogram
- Electrocardiogram
- Cardiac catheterization
- Cardiac CT scan
- Genetic testing (particularly if other systemic birth anomalies are seen alongside the pulmonary atresia and ventricular septal defect).

== Management ==
When the disorder is detected (usually before or soon after birth), prostaglandin will be temporarily used as soon as possible to keep the ductus arteriosus open for as long as possible until surgery can be done, this is done so that blood can keep flowing to the lungs, since the bodies of babies with pulmonary atresia usually use the ductus arteriosus for lung blood flow pre-natally until birth, after which it closes.

Afterwards, this anomaly is usually managed with surgeries for improvement of blood flow and function of the heart, although what kind of treatment one gets depends on the structure of the cardiorespiratory system.

The surgical methods that can be used to treat (for the long-term) this condition include:

- Catheter procedure for pulmonary artery branches
- Systemic-to-pulmonary artery shunt
- Neonatal complete repair
- One-stage complete repair
- Balloon septostomy
- Staged unifocalization

== Frequency ==
Frequency estimates vary between populations, estimates range from 0.01% to 0.2% of live births with PAVSD. It is believed to make up for 1-2% of cases of congenital heart defects worldwide.

Of all patients with PAVSD, around 25–32% of them have a microdeletion of the 22q11.2 chromosome.

== Prognosis ==
Without treatment, it is a highly life-threatening condition, so prognosis is poor. If surgery isn't performed in severe cases, the child can (and will) die, since the phenotype of pulmonary atresia is not compatible with life due to the pulmonary valve atresia resulting in reduced blood oxygenation.

Life expectancy for untreated children with PAVSD is 10 years. Survival rates for untreated people with this defect have been reported to be 50% at the tenth decade and 10% at the twentieth decade, and out of these untreated patients, those who do not have major aortopulmonary arteries have a higher chance of living to their 30s than those who do have them, as the latter have a 40% chance of surviving to the tenth decade and a 20% chance of doing so to the thirtieth decade.

Prognosis after surgical intervention is generally good.

== History ==
This combination of birth defects was first described in 1980 by DiChiara et al., their patients were a father and his son from the United States both of which had pulmonary atresia and a ventricular septal defect. Up until that point, there had been no familial cases of PA with a VSD. A multifactorial etiology (that is, a cause involving genetics and the environment) was suspected in these patients and they were offered medical counseling for the condition.

As of 2011, the oldest patient with untreated PAVSD was a 59-year-old woman from Japan. Her condition was discovered in childhood but she refused to get any surgery to treat it (including cardiac catheterization), she developed dyspnea during her teenage years. Radiological studies showed a ventricular septal defect alongside cardiac and arterial anomalies (heart silhouette enlargement, elevation of the cardiac apex, presence of a right aortic arch, enlargement affecting the main pulmonary arteries and their major branches, high pulmonary artery vascularity, and ventricular septal defect).

== See also ==
- Tricuspid atresia
- Mitral regurgitation
