= 654th Tank Destroyer Battalion =

US army battalion in WWII

The 654th Tank Destroyer Battalion codename: Highroad was a tank destroyer battalion of the United States Army active during the Second World War. The Battalion was activated on 15 December 1941 at Fort Benning, Georgia. They landed at Omaha Beach on July 11, 1944.

== History ==
The battalion was activated on 15 December 1941 at Fort Benning, Georgia, from personnel of the 4th Provisional Antitank Battalion, 4th Motorized Division (cadre from the 3rd Battalion, 22nd Infantry Regiment, and 4th Motorized Division Artillery). It was sent to England and equipped with the M10 tank destroyer. The 654th landed at Omaha Beach on 11 July 1944 to fight in the Normandy campaign and was sent into combat on the next day near Fallot. In August, it fought near Mortain during Operation Cobra, the Allied breakout from Normandy. It then advanced across France towards Nancy, fighting along the Siegfried Line and crossing the Saar River in early December. After the German counteroffensive in the Battle of the Bulge began, the battalion was deployed to the Ardennes sector on 21 December. In January 1945, after the counterattack was repulsed, the 654th moved back south to the Metz area. It returned to Belgium in February to receive the upgunned M36 tank destroyer. The battalion was sent back into combat in the Western Allied invasion of Germany, fighting in the offensive across the Roer River and crossing the Rhine on 24 March. It advanced into Germany to Tangerhütte, where it remained until assuming military government duties in early May after the German surrender. In Europe, the battalion was attached to the 5th Infantry Division, the 30th Infantry Division, the 35th Infantry Division, and the 75th Infantry Division. Returning to the United States, the battalion was inactivated at Camp Patrick Henry, Virginia, on 13 November 1945.

== Equipment ==
- M10 tank destroyer
- M36 tank destroyer
- 3 inch Gun M5
