= Ventriculotomy =

A ventriculotomy is any intrusion into a ventricle. It may specifically refer to:

- Ventriculotomy (cardiac), involving an intrusion into a ventricle of the heart
- Ventriculotomy (neurological), involving an intrusion into a ventricle of the brain
