= Pulmonary bay =

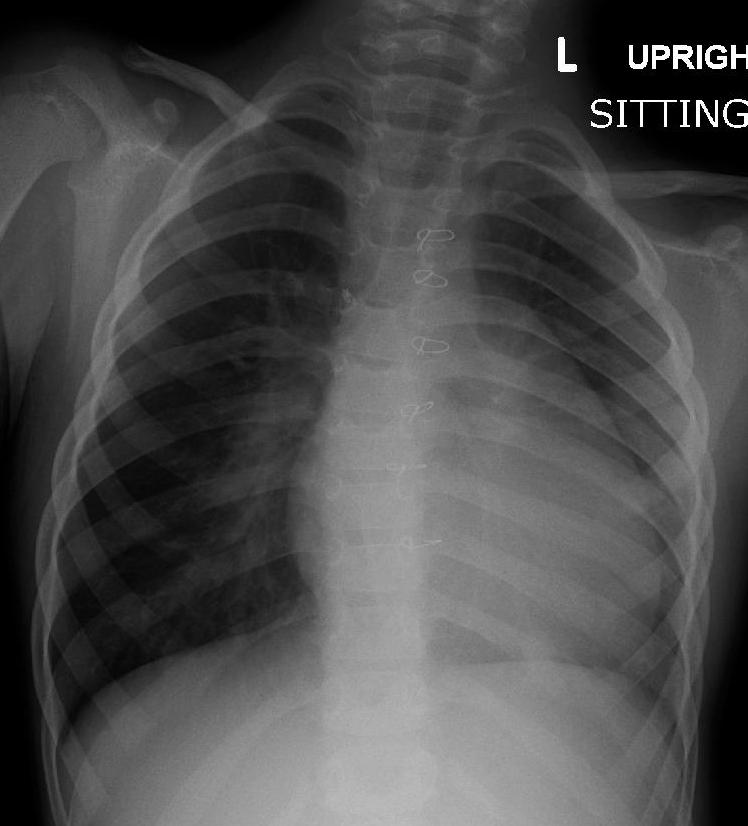
A CXR of a child with tetralogy of Fallot

Pulmonary bay is a radiological term which describes an area on the chest radiograph. This is the area just below the aortic knob representing the location of the main pulmonary artery. The pulmonary bay is usually concave, but in cases of diseases which cause enlargement of the pulmonary artery, the pulmonary bay can become convex.

Examples of diseases that cause a change in the pulmonary bay are Tetralogy of Fallot and other congenital heart diseases, and diseases of the heart valves.
