= Major aortopulmonary collateral artery =

Arteries that supply blood to the lungs

Major aortopulmonary collateral arteries (or MAPCAs) are arteries that develop to supply blood to the lungs when native pulmonary circulation is underdeveloped. Instead of coming from the pulmonary trunk, supply develops from the aorta and other systemic arteries.

== Pathogenesis and anatomy ==
Major aortopulmonary collateral arteries (MAPCAs) develop early in embryonic life but regress as the normal pulmonary arteries (vessels that will supply deoxygenated blood to the lungs) develop. In certain heart conditions the pulmonary arteries do not develop. The collaterals continue to grow, and can become the main supply of blood to the lungs. Though it is usually associated with congenital heart diseases with decreased pulmonary blood flow, like tetralogy of Fallot or pulmonary atresia, it may be seen sometimes in isolation (i.e. not associated with any congenital heart disease). In the latter case, it is termed as isolated aortopulmonary collateral artery. In these cases, it may be one of the causes of congestive cardiac failure in neonates.

The pulmonary arteries stem from the right side of the heart and usually carry deoxygenated blood from the body to the lungs. The collateral arteries carry blood which has already been oxygenated by the lungs, so they are of little use in helping the body to get oxygen.

=== Associated conditions ===
Pulmonary atresia with ventricular septal defect (or Tetralogy of Fallot with pulmonary atresia) will result in the development of systemic collaterals.

== Implications of a systemic collateral supply ==
Major aortopulmonary collateral arteries come from the systemic circulation. Because of this, they will often have higher pressure than that found in the lungs, leading to pulmonary hypertension. These vessels are not programmed to exist beyond early fetal life, and eventually became narrowed.

== Treatment ==
The aim of treatment of the MAPCAs is to group them together and convert their supply to deoxygenated blood from the right side of the heart.
