= Cœur en sabot =

Pattern seen in radiologic examinations

- Specialty: Cardiology
- Differential diagnosis: Tetralogy of Fallot

Cœur en sabot (French for "clog-shaped heart" or "boot-shaped heart") is a radiological sign seen most commonly in patients with tetralogy of Fallot, a cyanotic congenital heart disease. It is a radiological term to describe the following findings in the x-ray:

- The cardiac size is normal or mildly enlarged.
- The left cardiac border shows uplifted apex "outermost lower most point of the heart at the left side" denoting right ventricular enlargement.
- exaggerated cardiac waist, which means that the pulmonary segment is small and concave suggesting infundibular pulmonary stenosis.

Echocardiography has been used for confirmation and differentiation of congenital heart diseases.
