= Pulmonary regurgitation =

Pulmonary valve regurgitation
- Other names: Pulmonary insufficiency, pulmonary incompetence
- Diagram of the human heart
- Specialty: Cardiology
- Causes: Pulmonary hypertension, Infective endocarditis
- Diagnostic method: EKG, Echocardiogram
- Treatment: Depends on cause(See cause)

Pulmonary (or pulmonic) regurgitation (or insufficiency, incompetence) is a condition in which the pulmonary valve is incompetent and allows backflow from the pulmonary artery to the right ventricle of the heart during diastole. While a small amount of backflow may occur ordinarily, it is usually only shown on an echocardiogram and is harmless. More pronounced regurgitation that is noticed through a routine physical examination is a medical sign of disease and warrants further investigation. If it is secondary to pulmonary hypertension it is referred to as a Graham Steell murmur.

== Signs and symptoms ==
Because pulmonic regurgitation is the result of other factors in the body, any noticeable symptoms are ultimately caused by an underlying medical condition rather than the regurgitation itself. However, more severe regurgitation may contribute to right ventricular enlargement by dilation, and in later stages, right heart failure. A diastolic decrescendo murmur can sometimes be identified,( heard best) over the left lower sternal border.

== Causes ==
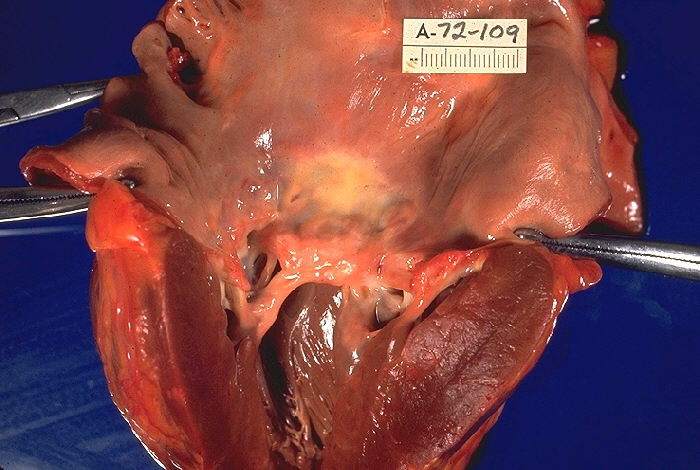
Rheumatic heart disease

Among the causes of pulmonary insufficiency are:

- Pulmonary hypertension
- Infective endocarditis
- Rheumatic heart disease
- Connective tissue disease
- Carcinoid syndrome
- Congenital abnormalities
- Tetralogy of Fallot,
- Prosthetic heart valve

== Pathophysiology ==
The pathophysiology is due to diastolic pressure variations between the pulmonary artery and right ventricle, differences are often very small, but increase regurgitation. An elevation in pulmonary insufficiency due to elevated intrathoracic pressure is relevant in ventilated patients (having acute restrictive right ventricular physiology). The reasons for changes in stiffness of the right ventricle's walls are not well understood, but such stiffness is thought to increase with hypertrophy of the ventricle.

== Diagnosis ==
In the diagnosis of pulmonary regurgitation both echocardiograms and ECG is used to ascertain if the individual has this condition, as well as, the use of a chest X-ray to expose enlargement of the right atrium or ventricle.

== Treatment ==
In treating pulmonary regurgitation, it should be determined if pulmonary hypertension is causing the problem to therefore begin the most appropriate therapy as soon as possible (primary pulmonary hypertension or secondary pulmonary hypertension due to thromboembolism). Furthermore, pulmonary regurgitation is generally treated by addressing the underlying condition, in certain cases, the pulmonary valve may be surgically replaced.

== See also ==
- Pulmonary valve stenosis
