= Overriding aorta =

- Diagram of a healthy heart and one suffering from overriding aorta
- Specialty: Cardiac surgery

An overriding aorta is a congenital heart defect where the aorta is positioned over a ventricular septal defect (VSD), instead of over the left ventricle. The result is that the aorta receives some blood from the right ventricle, causing mixing of oxygenated and deoxygenated blood, and thereby reducing the amount of oxygen delivered to the tissues.

It is one of the four findings in the classic tetralogy of Fallot. The other three findings are right ventricular outflow tract (RVOT) obstruction (most often subpulmonary stenosis), right ventricular hypertrophy (RVH), and ventricular septal defect (VSD).
