= Gustave Fallot =

French librarian and philologist

Gustave Fallot (17 November 1807 – 6 July 1836) was a French librarian and philologist.

Having obtained the diploma of palaeographer-archivist he was appointed sub-librarian of the Institut de France. He committed himself relentlessly to scholarship; he completed a manuscript on the origins of the French language and notably proposed writing a genealogical history of the human race by languages and a study of the Slavonic languages and literatures.
