= Right ventricular hypertrophy =

- Right ventricular hypertrophy
- Specialty: Cardiology

Right ventricular hypertrophy (RVH) is a condition defined by an abnormal enlargement of the cardiac muscle surrounding the right ventricle. The right ventricle is one of the four chambers of the heart. It is located towards the right lower chamber of the heart and it receives deoxygenated blood from the right upper chamber (right atrium) and pumps blood into the lungs.

Since RVH is an enlargement of muscle it arises when the muscle is required to work harder. Therefore, the main causes of RVH are pathologies of systems related to the right ventricle such as the pulmonary artery, the tricuspid valve or the airways.

RVH can be benign and have little impact on day-to-day life or it can lead to conditions such as heart failure, which has a poor prognosis.

== Signs and symptoms ==
=== Symptoms ===
Although presentations vary, individuals with right ventricular hypertrophy can experience symptoms that are associated with pulmonary hypertension, heart failure and/or a reduced cardiac output. These include:

- Difficulty breathing on exertion
- Chest pain (angina) on exertion
- Fainting (syncope) on exertion
- General fatigue/lethargy
- Dizziness
- Feeling of fullness in the upper abdominal area
- Discomfort or pain in the right upper abdomen
- Reduced appetite
- Swelling (oedema) of the legs, ankles or feet
- Racing heart beat (palpitations)

People may rarely present with the symptoms of Ortner's syndrome, which include cough, haemoptysis and hoarseness.

=== Signs ===
On physical examination, the most prominent features are due to the development of right-sided heart failure. These can include a raised jugular venous pressure, ascites, left parasternal heave and a tender, enlarged liver on palpation. On inspection, patients may be chronically ill, cyanotic, cachectic and occasionally jaundiced.

On auscultation, an accentuated second pulmonary sound (S2), a third heart sound termed a ‘right ventricular gallop’, as well as a systolic murmur over the tricuspid area accentuated by inspiration may be present. On occasion, the systolic murmur can be transmitted and auscultated over the liver. Less typically, diastolic murmur may also be heard as a result of pulmonary insufficiency.

== Causes ==
RVH usually occurs due to chronic lung disease or structural defects in the heart. One of the most common causes of RVH is pulmonary hypertension (PH), defined as increased blood pressure in the vessels supplying blood to the lungs. PH leads to increased pulmonary artery pressure. The right ventricle tries to compensate for this increased pressure by changing its shape and size. Hypertrophy of individual myocytes results in an increase in right ventricular wall thickness. The worldwide incidence of PH is 4 per million people. RVH occurs in approximately 30% of these cases.

PH is broadly split into five categories by the World Health Organization, based on the underlying cause. The incidence of RVH varies between the groups. Common causes of PH include chronic obstructive pulmonary disease (COPD), pulmonary embolism, and other restrictive lung diseases. RVH often occurs as a result of these disorders. RVH is seen in 76% of patients with advanced COPD and 50% of patients with restrictive lung disease.

RVH also occurs in response to structural defects in the heart. One common cause is tricuspid insufficiency. This is a disorder where the tricuspid valve fails to close properly, allowing backward flow of blood. Other structural defects which lead to RVH include tetralogy of Fallot, ventricular septal defects, pulmonary valve stenosis, and atrial septal defects. RVH is also associated with abdominal obesity, elevated fasting blood glucose, high systolic blood pressure, and fractional shortening of the left ventricular mid-wall.

Other risk factors for RVH include smoking, sleep apnea, and strenuous activity. These increase the risk of heart and lung disease and hence RVH.

== Pathophysiology ==
Right ventricular hypertrophy can be both a physiological and pathophysiological process. It becomes pathophysiological (damaging) when there is excessive hypertrophy. The pathophysiological process mainly occurs through aberrant signalling of the neuroendocrine hormones; angiotensin II, endothelin-1 and the catecholamines (e.g. noradrenaline).

=== Angiotensin-II and endothelin-1 ===
Angiotensin-II and endothelin-1 are hormones that bind to the angiotensin (AT) and endothelin (ET) receptors. These are G-protein coupled receptors that act via internal signalling pathways. Through several intermediates, these pathways directly or indirectly increase reactive oxygen species (ROS) production causing accumulation in myocardial cells. This can subsequently induce necrotic cell death, fibrosis, and mitochondrial dysfunction.

This has been demonstrated in animal studies. Protein Kinase C (PKC) is an intermediate molecule in the signalling pathway and mice lacking PKC shown resistance to heart failure compared to mice overexpressing PKC which shown heart dysfunction.

Targeting the renin–angiotensin (RAAS) system (using angiotensin-converting enzyme inhibitors and angiotensin-receptor blockers) are a well-recognized clinical approach for reversing maladaptive cardiac hypertrophy independently of blood pressure.

=== Catecholamines ===
Catecholamines levels increase due to increased sympathetic nervous system activity. Catecholamines can act on the alpha-adrenergic receptors and beta-adrenergic receptors which are G-protein coupled receptors. This binding initiates the same intracellular signalling pathways as angiotensin and endothelin. There is also activation of cAMP and an increase in intracellular Ca2+ which leads to contractile dysfunction and fibrosis.

=== Others ===
Hormones are not the only cause of RVH. Hypertrophy can also be caused by mechanical forces, mTOR pathways, nitric oxide and immune cells. Immune cells can cause hypertrophy by inducing inflammation.

== Diagnosis ==
Hexaxial reference system

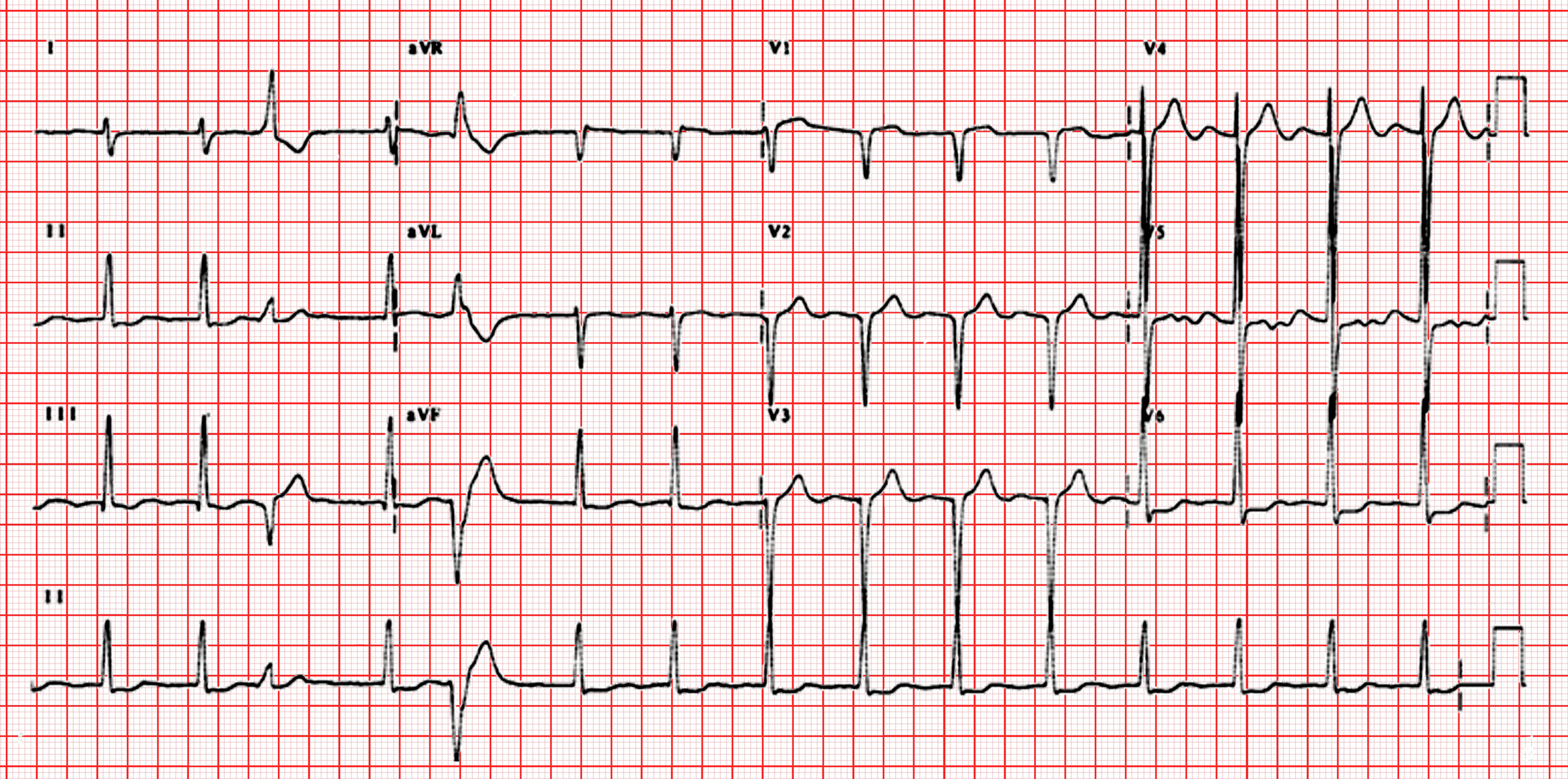
ECG showing right axis deviation

The two main diagnostic tests used to confirm right ventricular hypertrophy are electrocardiography and echocardiography.

=== Electrocardiography ===
The use of electrocardiogram (ECG) to measure cardiac chamber hypertrophy is well established but since the left ventricular activity is dominant on the ECG a large degree of RVH is often required for any detectable changes. Nonetheless, the ECG is used to assist with the diagnosis of RVH. A post mortem study on 51 adult male patients concluded that anatomical RVH may be diagnosed using one or more of the following ECG criteria:

- Right axis deviation of more than (or equal to) 110° (see hexaxial reference figure)
- R-wave dominant over S-wave in V1 or V2
- S-wave dominant over R-wave in V6

However, the American Heart Association recommended the use of additional diagnostic tests to diagnose RVH because no single criteria or set of criteria were considered sufficiently reliable.

=== Echocardiography ===
Echocardiography can be used to directly visualise right ventricular wall thickness. The preferred technique is the trans-oesophageal approach giving a view of 4 chambers. The normal thickness of a right ventricular free wall ranges from 2–5 millimetres, with a value above 5 mm considered to be hypertrophic.

== Treatment ==
Right ventricular hypertrophy in itself is not the main issue, but what right ventricular hypertrophy represents is. Right ventricular hypertrophy is the intermediate stage between increased right ventricular pressure (in the early stages) and right ventricle failure (in the later stages). As such, management of right ventricular hypertrophy is about either preventing the development of right ventricular hypertrophy in the first place, or preventing the progression towards right ventricle failure. Right ventricular hypertrophy in itself has no (pharmacological) treatment.

=== Treating the cause ===
Since the main causes of right ventricular hypertrophy is tricuspid regurgitation or pulmonary hypertension (discussed above), management involves treatment of these conditions. Tricuspid regurgitation is typically treated conservatively by aiming to treat the underlying cause and following up the patient regularly. Surgery is considered in more serious situations where the patient is severely symptomatic. Surgical options include either: replacement of the valve or repair of the valve (termed annuloplasty). When it comes to replacement, there is a choice between a bioprosthetic valve or a mechanical valve, depending upon the specific patient characteristics. Mechanical valve has greater durability, but requires anti-coagulation to reduce the risk of thrombosis. Treatment of pulmonary hypertension will depend on the specific cause of the pulmonary hypertension. On top of this, the following may also be considered: diuretic, oxygen and anti-coagulant therapy.

=== Managing the complications ===
After a prolonged period, the right ventricle fails to adapt sufficiently to pump against increased right ventricle pressure, which is termed right ventricular failure. This right ventricular failure is the main complication of right ventricular hypertrophy. The mechanisms underlying the progression from hypertrophy to failure is not well understood, and the best management approach involves reducing/minimising the risk factors of progression. Lifestyle changes can often help to reduce the risk of this progression. Lifestyle changes include: eating less salty food as salt consumption leads to greater fluid retention by the body; smoking cessation; avoiding excessive alcohol consumption as alcohol reduces the force of heart contractions. Once right ventricular hypertrophy progresses to right ventricular failure, the treatment becomes that of heart failure. Briefly, this includes the use of:

- Diuretics
- 3 ACEi
- Beta Blockers
- Aldosterone
- Antagonists
- Cardiac glycosides
- Vasodilators
