= Apicoaortic conduit =

Cardiothoracic surgical process

Apicoaortic Conduit
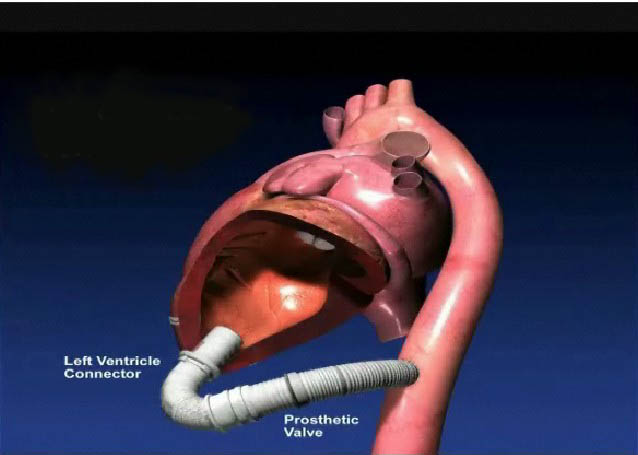
- A completed apicoaortic conduit shown with the left ventricle partially cut away. The natural aortic valve is visible at the top of the left ventricle.
- Other names: Aortic Valve Bypass
- Specialty: Cardiology

Apicoaortic Conduit (AAC), also known as Aortic Valve Bypass (AVB), is a cardiothoracic surgical procedure that alleviates symptoms caused by blood flow obstruction from the left ventricle of the heart. Left ventricular outflow tract obstruction (LVOTO) is caused by narrowing of the aortic valve (aortic stenosis) and other valve disorders. AAC, or AVB, relieves the obstruction to blood flow by adding a bioprosthetic valve to the circulatory system to decrease the load on the aortic valve. When an apicoaortic conduit is implanted, blood continues to flow from the heart through the aortic valve. In addition, blood flow bypasses the native valve and exits the heart through the implanted valved conduit. The procedure is effective at relieving excessive pressure gradient across the natural valve. High pressure gradient across the aortic valve can be congenital or acquired. A reduction in pressure gradient results in relief of symptoms.

== Configuration ==
The figure depicts a typical apicoaortic configuration with a left ventricle connector sutured to the apex of the heart, and a conduit containing a bioprosthetic valve anastomosed to the descending thoracic aorta. Blood exits the left ventricle either through the natural valve or the bypass conduit.

== History ==
The concept of an apicoaortic conduit to bypass valvular aortic stenosis (AS) was conceived by Carrel in 1910, and performed experimentally by Sarnoff and colleagues on dogs in 1955. In 1962-63, Templeton implanted prostheses similar to those originally described by Sarnoff in five patients with severe aortic valve stenosis; one patient survived more than 10 years. In 1975, Bernhard and coworkers reported a reoperation in which a conduit was implanted between the left ventricle and the thoracic aorta. The procedure was also developed in the late 1970s as a way to treat complex left ventricular outflow tract obstructions (LVOTO) in children and young adults. AAC is no longer performed on children as the Ross procedure has superseded it.

Today, AAC is performed clinically on elderly aortic stenosis patients, and has gained in popularity in recent years. In the past 25 years, a number of case series on adults have been published. As of 2010, the estimated total number of AAC cases performed worldwide in the last 30 years is greater than 1500. The procedure has not been adopted widely because it is technically challenging and blood loss can be significant. The most difficult part of the procedure is the insertion of a left ventricle connector into the apex of the heart.

== Devices ==
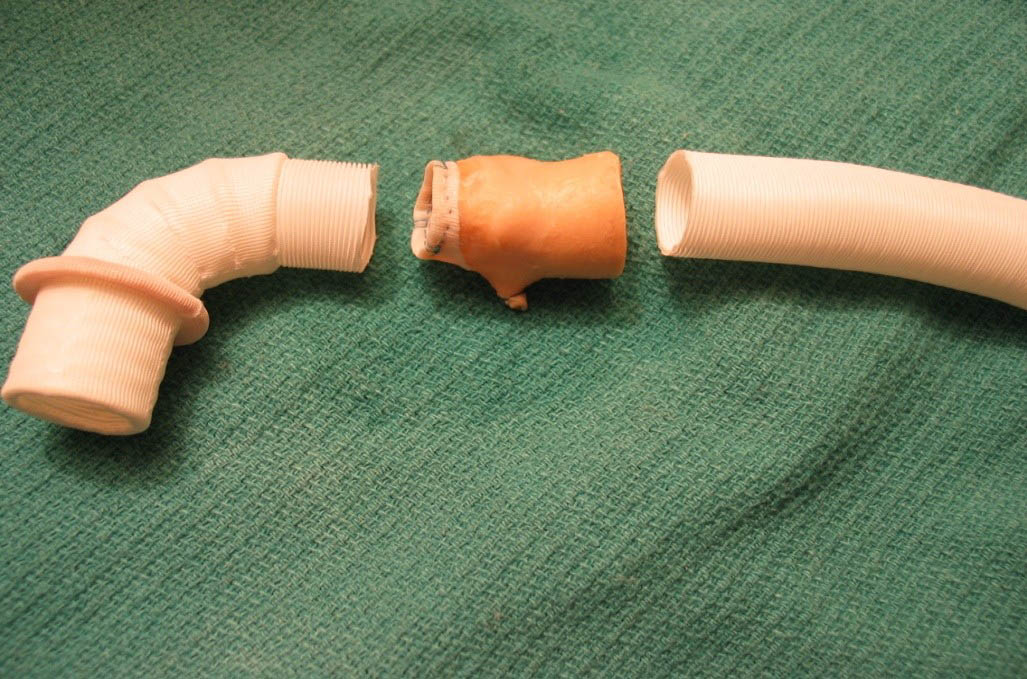
Components of an AVB implant: the Hancock connector and Medtronic Freestyle porcine valve. The surgeon sutures these together on the back table within the operating room.

AAC requires specialized implants and installation tools. Hancock Laboratories, now part of Medtronic (Minneapolis, MN), developed and released a set of left ventricle connectors, valved conduits, and installation trocars in the 1970s. The Hancock left ventricle connectors, with inner diameters of 12 to 22 mm, have been used clinically for the vast majority of AAC procedures reported in the literature. For the valved conduit, surgeons have used the Medtronic Hancock Model 105 or 150 valved conduits which contain a complete porcine aortic valve. Other surgeons have constructed valved conduits on the back table using a variety of bioprosthetic valves such as the Medtronic Freestyle valve. The Hancock trocars for creating a hole in the left ventricle are rarely used clinically. Surgeons typically assemble their own tools to core and remove a plug of muscle from the left ventricular wall.

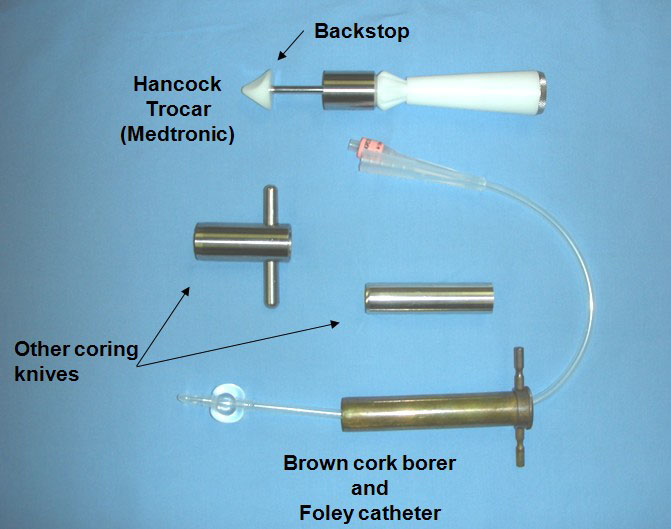
A variety of coring tools have been created by surgeons performing AAC or AVB.

In 2011, Correx (Waltham, MA) released a complete kit for AVB with an installation tool that enables coring and insertion of a left ventricle connector on a beating heart while maintaining hemostasis. Cardiopulmonary bypass (CPB) is not required. The kit is CE Marked and available in Europe. Several cases have been done in Canada under the Special Access Programme. This kit is not currently available for use or sale in the United States.

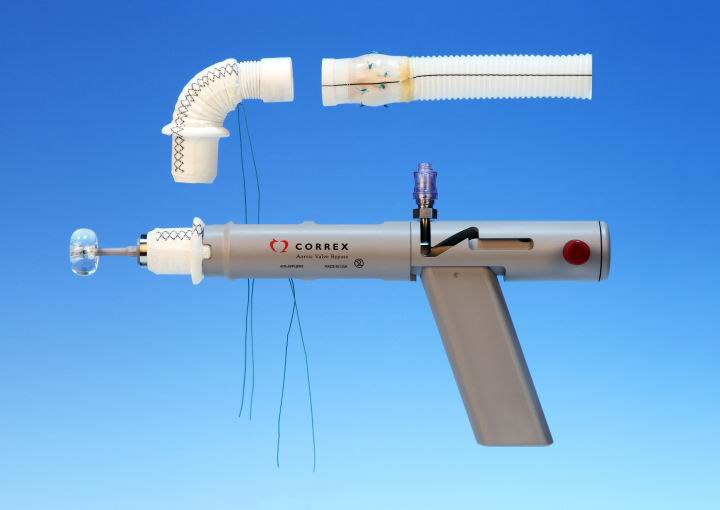
Complete AVB Kit: Left Ventricle Connector, Valved Conduit, and Installation Tool shown with connector installed

== Procedure ==
The general procedure has evolved over the years as surgeons gained experience and improved techniques. A video of an AVB procedure performed by Dr. Jim Gammie of the University of Maryland Medical Center can be found here.

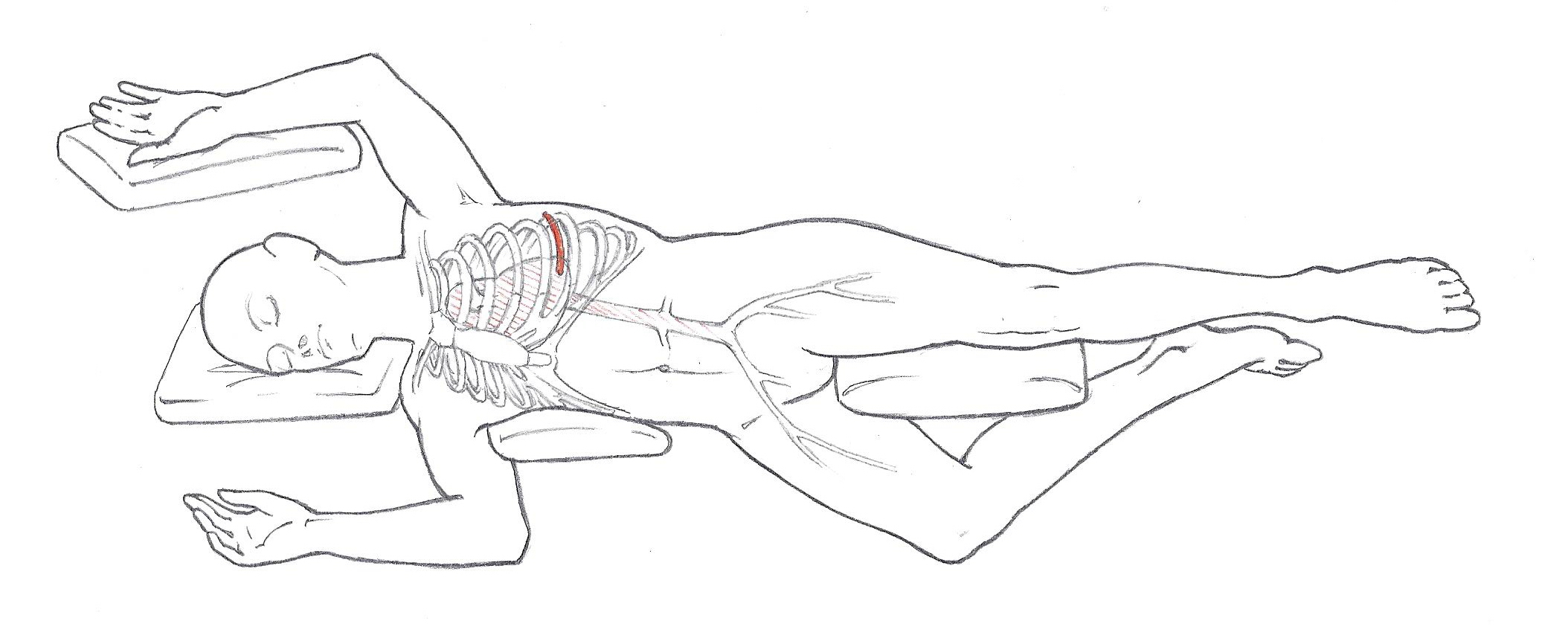
Patient positioning for a left anterior thoracotomy

=== Preparation ===
The patient is placed on the table in the supine position. Anesthesia is induced, and the patient is intubated with a double-lumen endotracheal tube, which facilitates one-lung ventilation and allows the surgeon to work within the left chest. The patient is positioned with his or her left side up (see figure). A left anterior-lateral thoracotomy is performed between the fifth and sixth ribs to expose the heart and provide access to the descending aorta. A portion of a rib may be removed to enable easier access and to minimize the chance of a rib fracture. The left lung is deflated and retracted.

=== Distal Anastomosis ===
With the descending aorta exposed, the surgeon applies a side clamp to the aorta, effectively pinching and isolating one side of the great vessel. Blood continues to flow to the body's lower half through the unisolated remainder of the aorta. A lengthwise slit is made through the pinched face, and the open end of the valved conduit is carefully sutured to the slit. Once the suture line is checked for leaks, the aortic partial side clamp is removed and the valved conduit fills with blood up to the bioprosthetic valve. The valve acts as a check valve, thereby maintaining hemostasis.

=== Left Ventricle Connector Installation ===
The surgeon next opens the pericardium and exposes the apex of the heart. The surgeon closely examines the surface of the heart and chooses and marks an insertion site near the apex. A ring of sutures reinforced with pledgets is installed around the insertion site. The free ends of the sutures are looped through a sewing ring on the left ventricle connector. At this point, CPB is typically initiated, although a few surgeons are able to complete the left ventricle installation off-pump (without CPB). A circular core of myocardium is cut and removed using specialized coring tools. Care must be taken to avoid damaging structures inside the left ventricle such as the interventricular septum, and the chordae tendineae. The left ventricle connector is filled with sterile saline to displace any air and then inserted into the hole. The sutures are sequentially tightened and tied off to permanently secure the left ventricle connector to the apex. CPB is terminated.

With blood now flowing through the bypass conduit, the left ventricular outflow tract obstruction (LVOTO) is effectively relieved. 60% to 70% of the heart's output flows through the bypass to the aorta. The load on the heart is markedly reduced, and symptoms such as dyspnea, syncope, and chest pain disappear.

== Outcomes ==
Patients historically referred for apicoaortic conduit surgery have been considered high risk or ineligible for conventional aortic valve replacement. The literature reports generally favorable outcomes for apicoaortic surgery given the age, frailty, and comorbidities of the patient population. Patients typically improve from New York Heart Association Functional Classification III or IV to Class I or II. AVB effectively relieves the LVOTO caused by aortic stenosis.

There is long-term stability of the left ventricular hemodynamics after AVB, with no further biologic progression of native aortic valve stenosis. Once the pressure gradient across the native valve is substantially reduced, the narrowing and calcification of the native valve halts. In one study of 47 patients whose average age was 82 years, the mean gradient across the native valve was reduced from 46 +/- 14 mm HG to 17 +/- 7 mm HG.

=== Low Incidence of Stroke ===
Throughout the published literature, perioperative stroke is uncommon. This is because the native valve and ascending aorta are not manipulated in any way. Calcified layers and other debris do not break free and migrate to the brain.

The literature also reports that postoperative stroke is rare. Whenever a prosthetic device such as a valve is introduced into the bloodstream, there is an ongoing risk of thrombus formation which can lead to an embolism should the thrombus become mobile. Computational flow studies conclude that the presence of an aortic valve bypass conduit has no effect on cerebral blood flow. All blood flow to the brain continues to flow across the native valve. Should a thrombus form on the bioprosthetic valve in the bypass conduit, it will likely migrate to the lower half of the body and not to the brain. This fact is believed to reduce the long-term risk of cerebral thromboembolism (stroke) with AAC.

=== Need for Pacemakers is Uncommon ===
The published literature reports that the need for pacemaker after AAC is very rare as the (electrical) conduction center of the heart near the aortic valve is not disturbed in any way.

=== Paravalvular Leak is Impossible ===
AAC avoids the risk of leakage around a replacement heart valve (aortic insufficiency), a serious complication of alternate treatments such as aortic valve replacement (AVR) and percutaneous aortic valve replacement (PAVR or TAVI). With AAC, the native aortic valve is left completely undisturbed.

== Patients receiving AAC ==
With aortic valve replacement (AVR) as the accepted standard of care for critical AS, patients receiving apicoaortic conduits have often been refused AVR and as such are considered "no option" patients. AAC is also sometimes chosen by surgeons and cardiologists over other treatments, such as AVR and percutaneous aortic valve replacement (PAVR or TAVI), to treat critical AS. Patients who could benefit from AAC or AVB include those who:

- Have had coronary artery bypass surgery and have patent grafts
- Have had mediastinal radiation or infection after a prior median sternotomy
- Have elevated risk of stroke, or history of stroke
- Have heavily calcified, or "porcelain" ascending aortas
- Have large or small aortic annular diameters
- Have low coronary ostia (these are the inlets to the left and right coronary arteries just above the aortic valve)
- Have heart (electrical) conduction disorders
