= Ventriculotomy (cardiac) =

Form of heart surgery

A ventriculotomy is a heart surgery that involves an incision into one or both ventricles. It is a component of many heart surgeries, including infarctectomy and many congenital heart defect surgeries. In the long-term, a prior ventriculotomy can increase the risk of ventricular arrhythmia. Right ventriculotomy often causes right bundle branch block if it is extensive. Modern congenital surgery techniques have reduced the long-term effects of ventriculotomy and its repair.
