= Arthur Fallot =

French physician

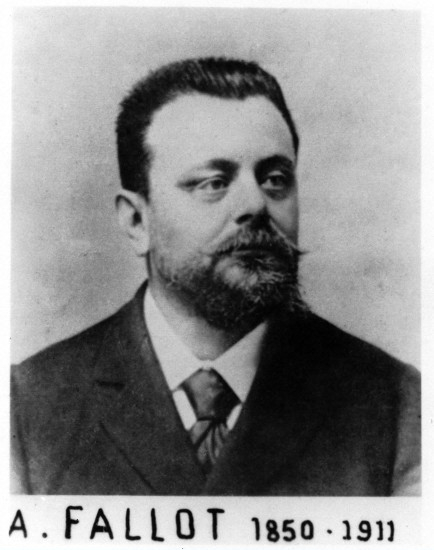
- Born: Étienne-Louis Arthur Fallot; 29 September 1850
- Died: 30 April 1911 (aged 60)
- Known for: Tetralogy of Fallot

Étienne-Louis Arthur Fallot (September 29, 1850, in Sète, Hérault – April 30, 1911) was a French physician.

Fallot attended medical school in Montpellier in 1867. While in residence in Marseille he wrote a thesis on pneumothorax. In 1888 he was made Professor of Hygiene and Legal Medicine in Marseille. In 1888 Fallot described in detail the four anatomical characteristics of tetralogy of Fallot, a congenital heart defect responsible for blue baby syndrome.
