= Pulmonary valve =

Semilunar valve of the heart

- Anterior (frontal) view of the opened heart. White arrows indicate normal blood flow.

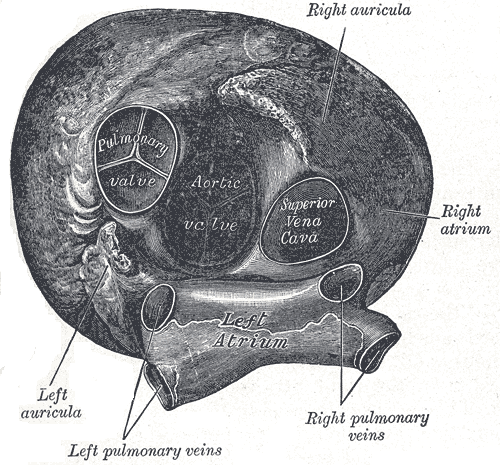
- Heart seen from above.

Details

Identifiers
- Latin: valva trunci pulmonalis
- MeSH: D011664
- TA98: A12.1.02.010
- TA2: 4008
- FMA: 7246

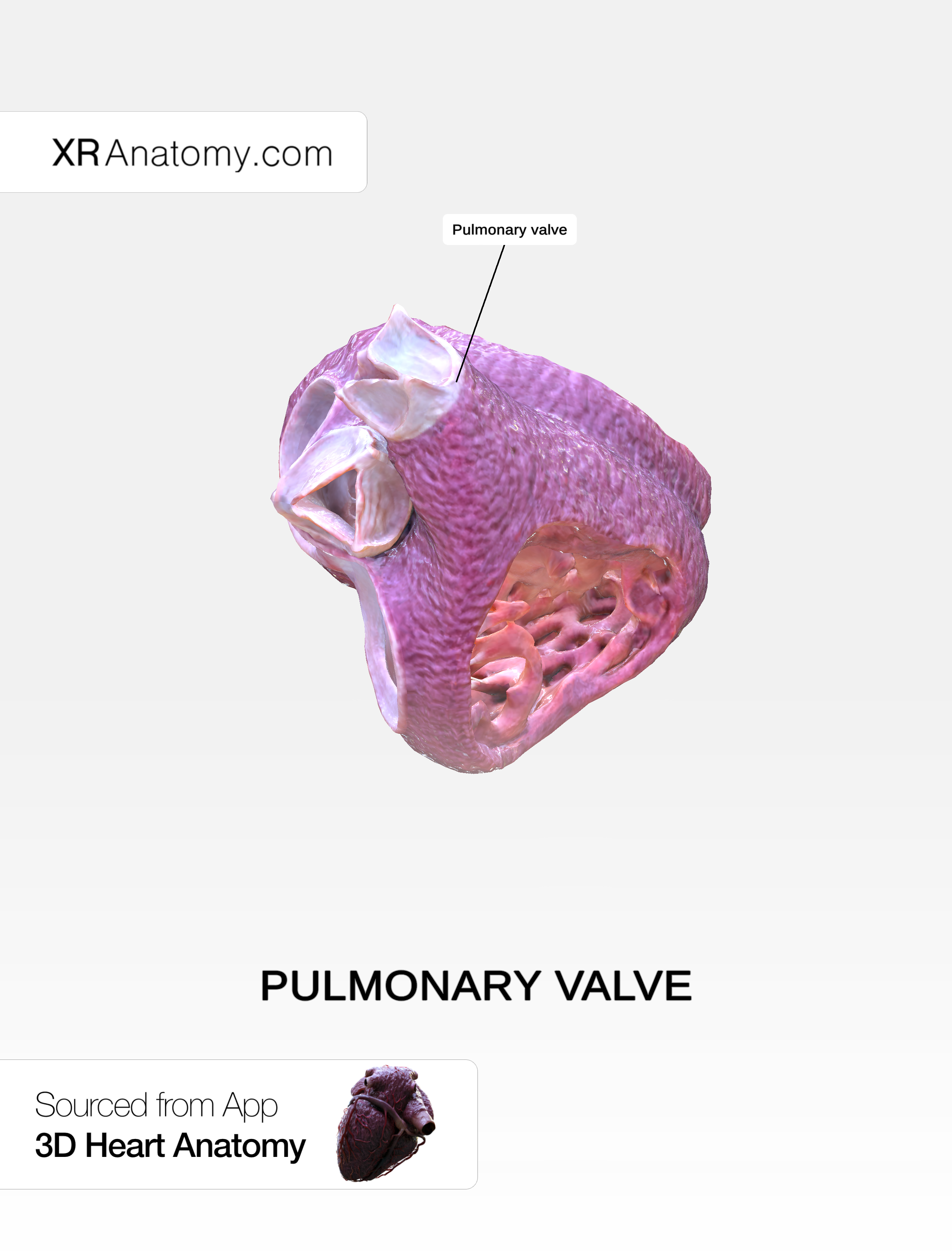

The pulmonary valve (sometimes referred to as the pulmonic valve) is a valve of the heart that lies between the right ventricle and the pulmonary artery, and has three cusps. It is one of the four valves of the heart and one of the two semilunar valves, the other being the aortic valve. Similar to the aortic valve, the pulmonary valve opens in ventricular systole when the pressure in the right ventricle rises above the pressure in the pulmonary artery. At the end of ventricular systole, when the pressure in the right ventricle falls rapidly, the pressure in the pulmonary artery closes the pulmonary valve.

The closure of the pulmonary valve contributes to the P2 component of the second heart sound (S2).

== Structure ==
The pulmonary orifice lies nearly in the horizontal plane, and is situated at a superior level than the aortic orifice.

=== Cusps ===
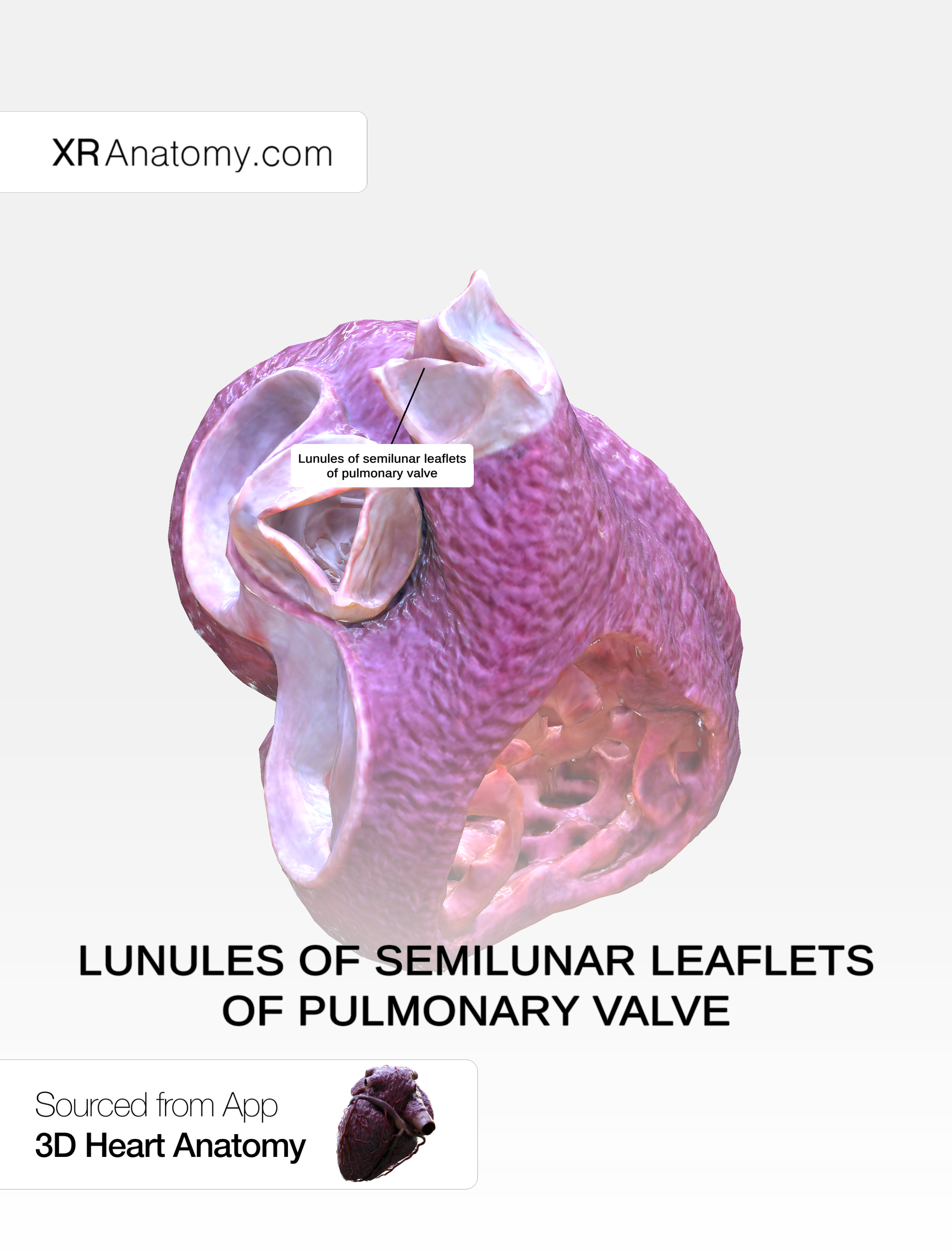

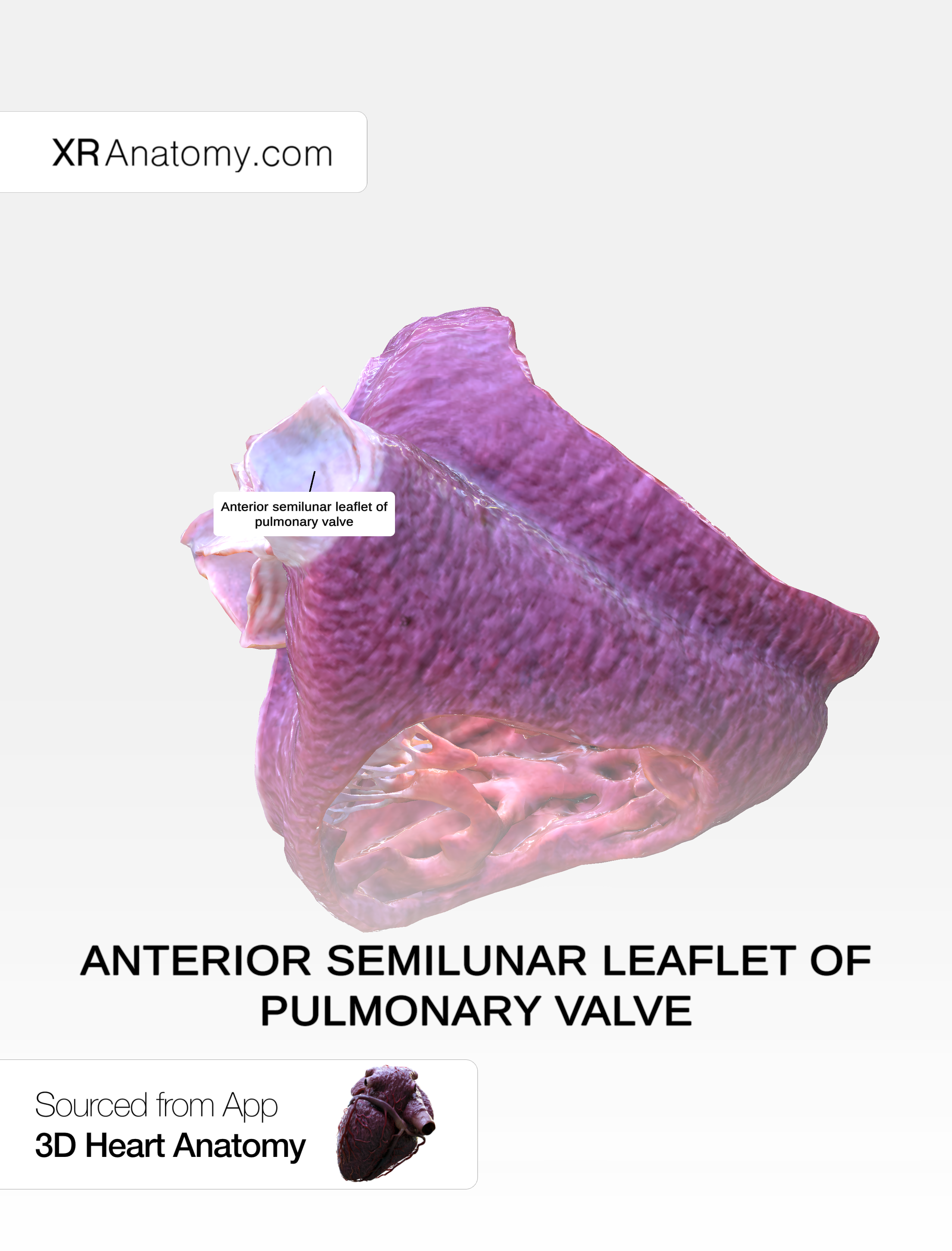

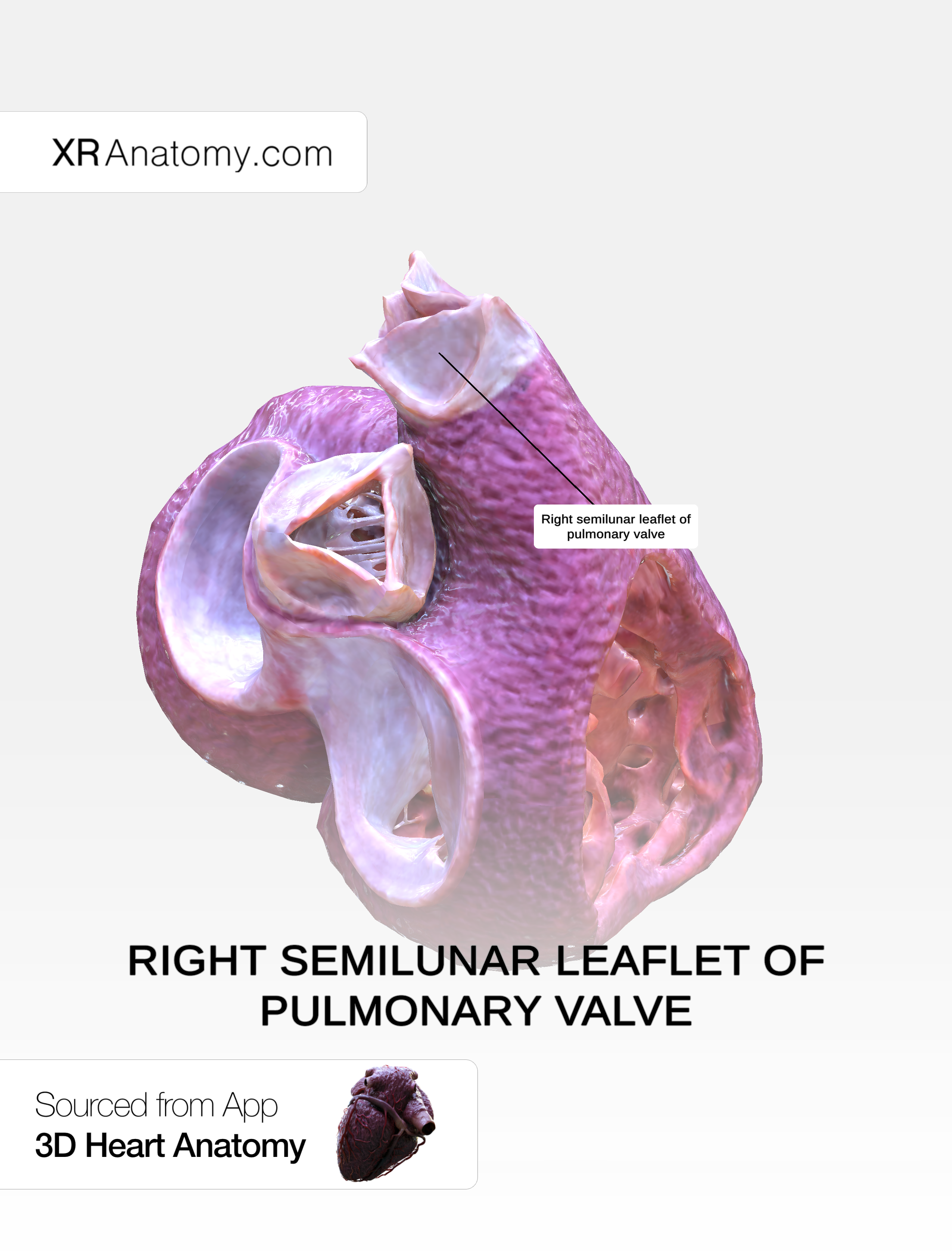

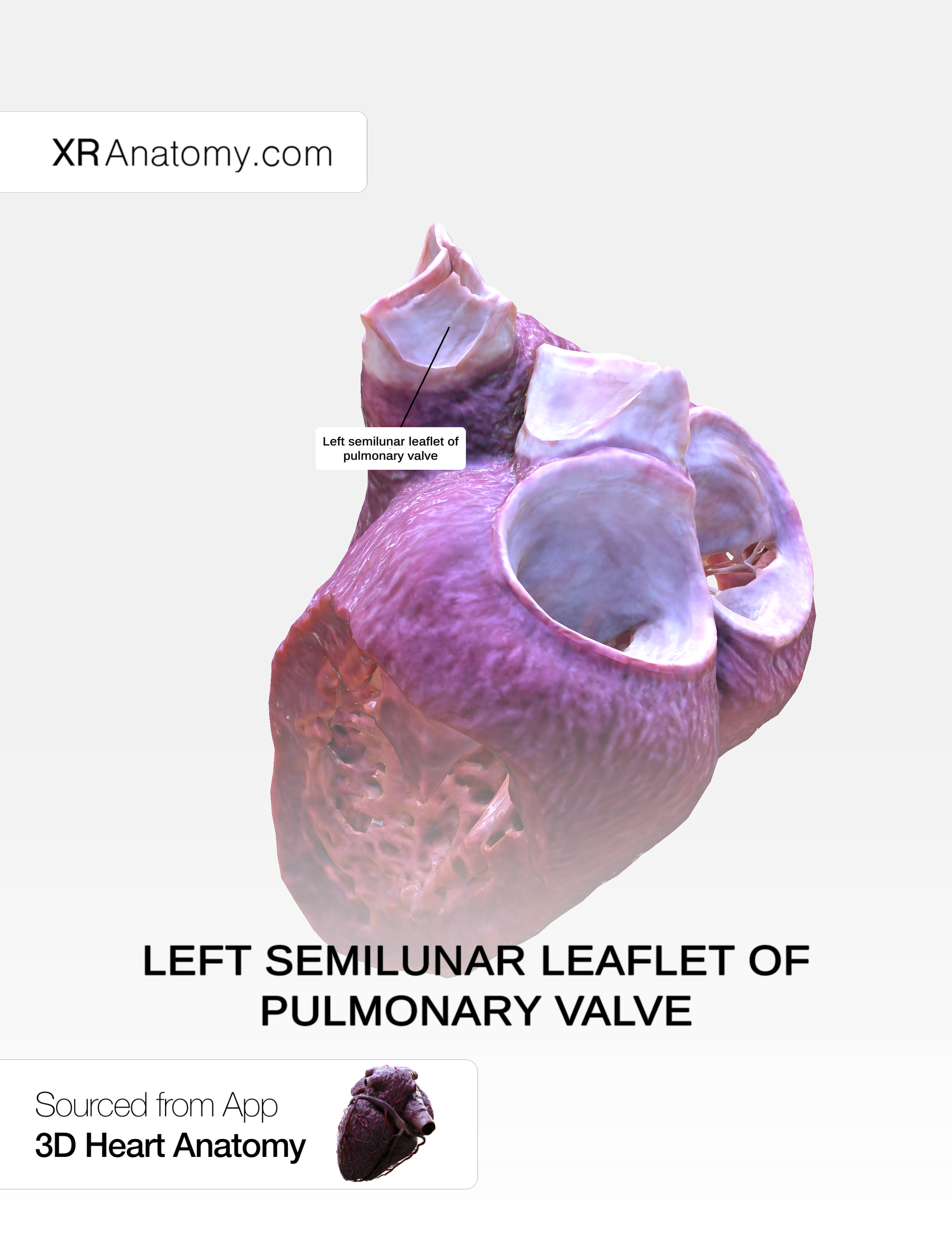

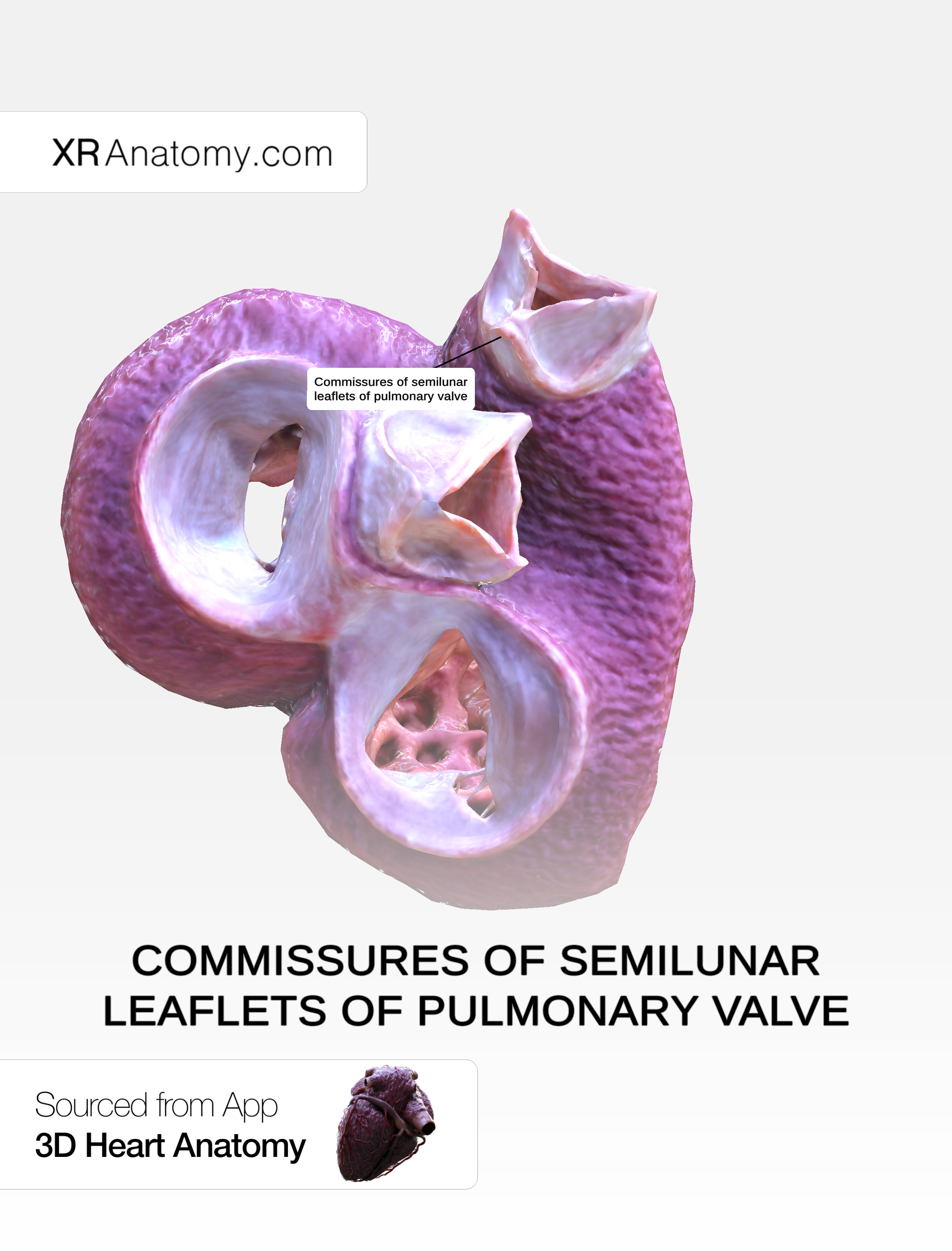

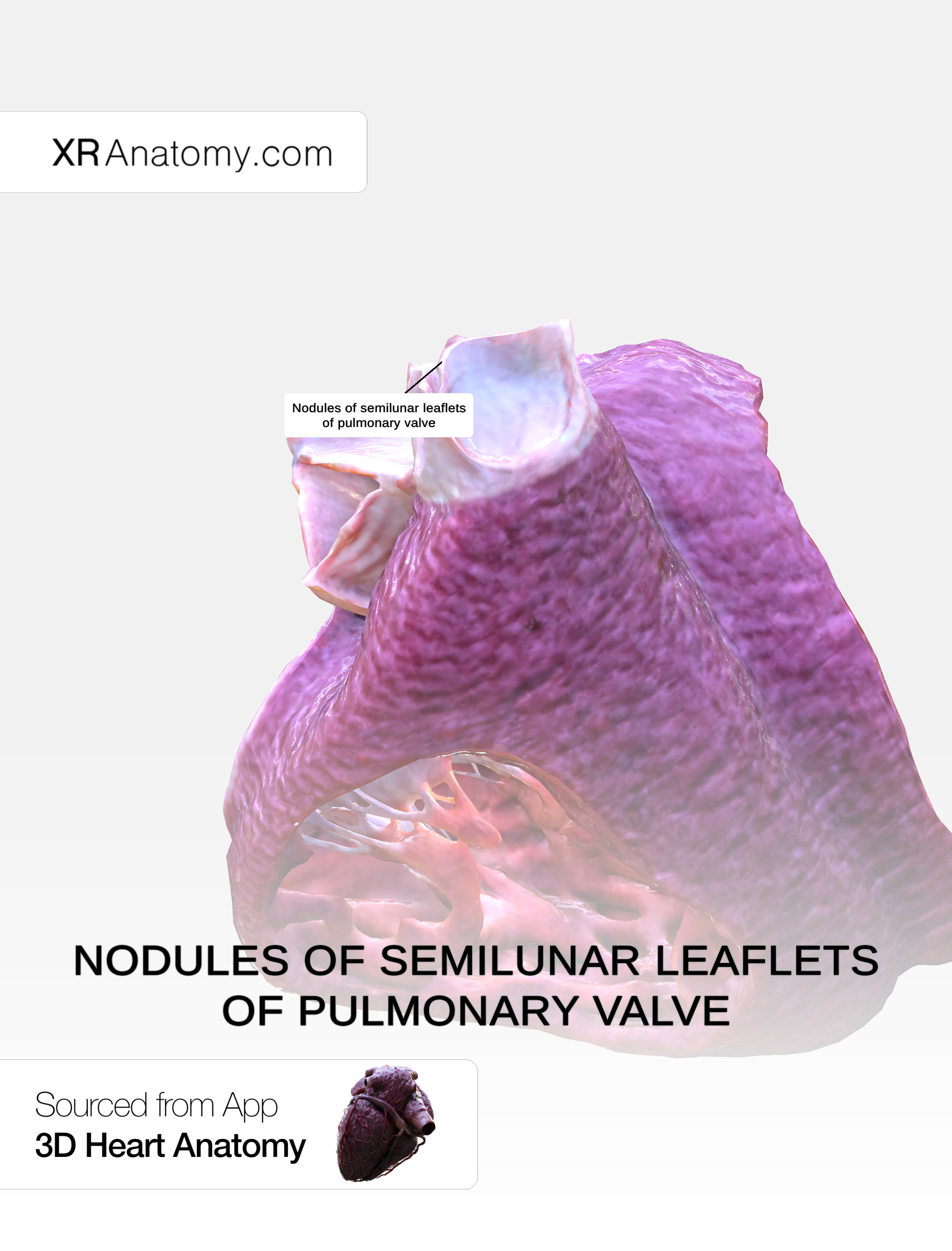

At the apex of the infundibulum, the pulmonary orifice is guarded by three semilunar cusps - two anterior and one posterior, with free edges projecting upward into the lumen of pulmonary trunk. The cusps are named according to their positions during foetal development: the anterior, the posterior, and the septal cusp. The free edge of each cusp presents a fibrous nodule of semilunar cusp at the centre with two lateral thin portions, the lunule of semilunar cusp. Each cusp forms pocket like dilatation called pulmonary sinus at the initial portion of pulmonary trunk.

== Clinical significance ==
The right heart is a low-pressure system, so the P2 component of the second heart sound is usually softer than the A2 component of the second heart sound. However, it is physiologically normal in some young people to hear both components separated during inhalation.

== See also ==
- Heart valve
- Pulmonary atresia

== Additional images ==
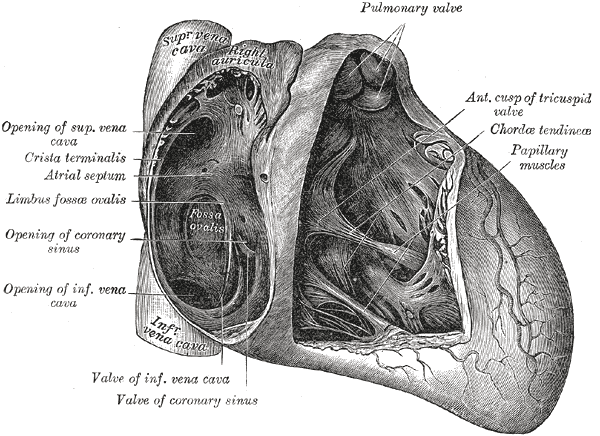
Interior of right side of heart.

Front of thorax, showing surface relations of bones, lungs (purple), pleura (blue), and heart (red outline). Heart valves are labeled with "B", "T", "A", and "P".

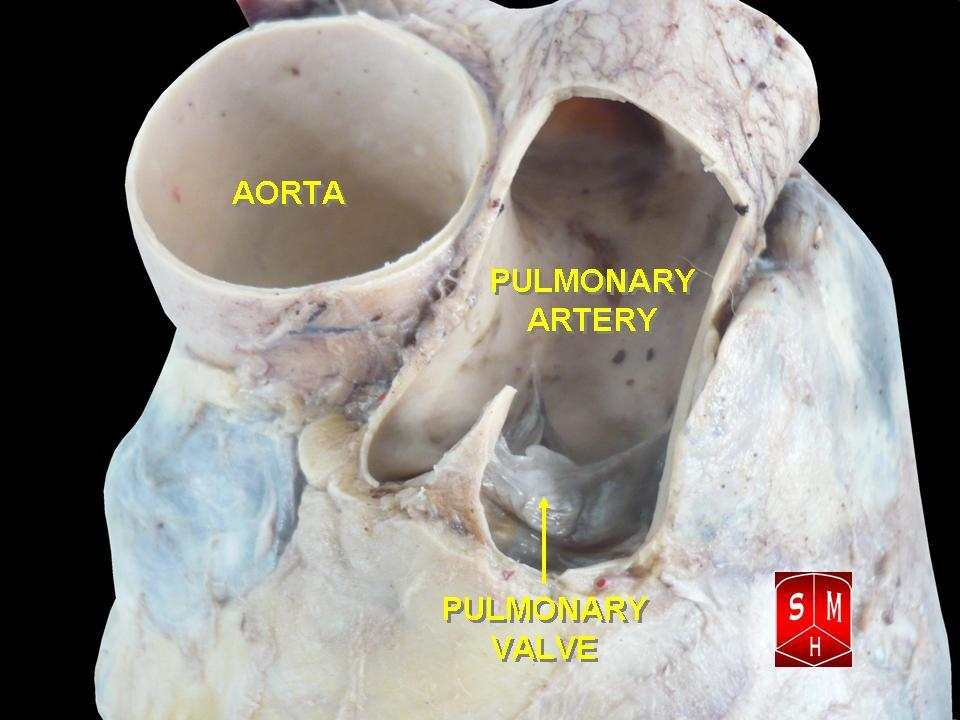
Pulmonary valves

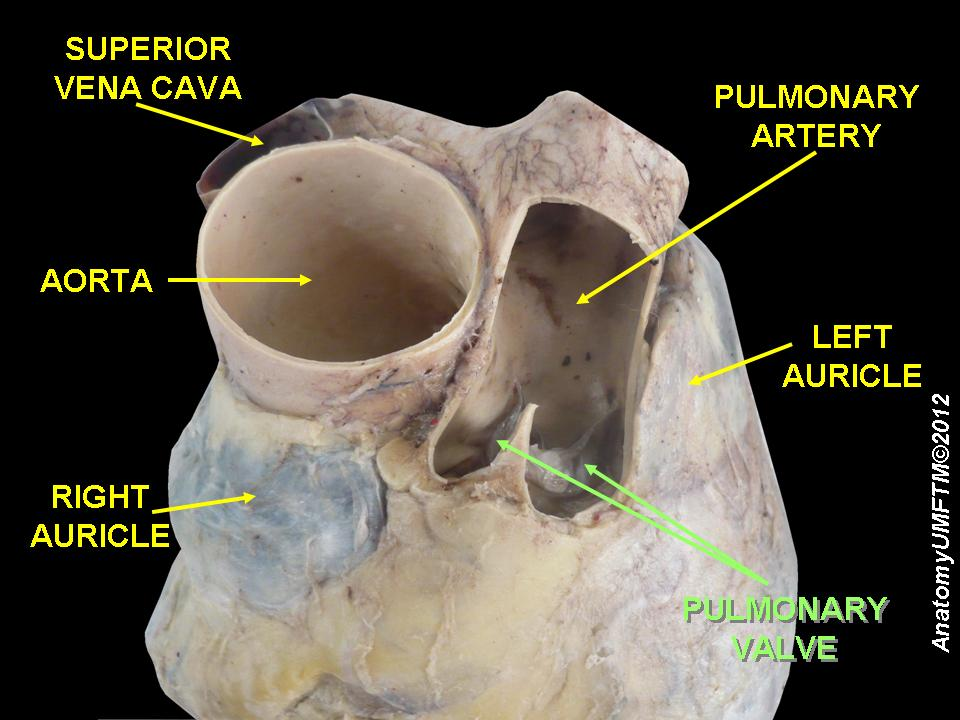
Pulmonary valves
