= Ventilation–perfusion coupling =

Relationship between respiratory and cardiovascular processes

Ventilation–perfusion coupling is the relationship between ventilation and perfusion in the respiratory and cardiovascular systems. Ventilation is the movement of air in and out of the lungs during breathing. Perfusion is the process of pulmonary blood circulation, which reoxygenates blood, allowing it to transport oxygen to body tissues. Lung structure, alveolar organization, and alveolar capillaries contribute to the physiological mechanism of ventilation and perfusion.

Ventilation–perfusion coupling maintains a constant ventilation/perfusion ratio near 0.8 on average, with regional variation within the lungs due to gravity. When the ratio gets above or below 0.8, it is considered abnormal ventilation-perfusion coupling, also known as a ventilation–perfusion mismatch. Lung diseases, cardiac shunts, and smoking can cause a ventilation–perfusion mismatch that results in significant symptoms and diseases; treatments include bronchodilators and oxygen therapy.

Diagram of anatomy of pulmonary alveolar structure

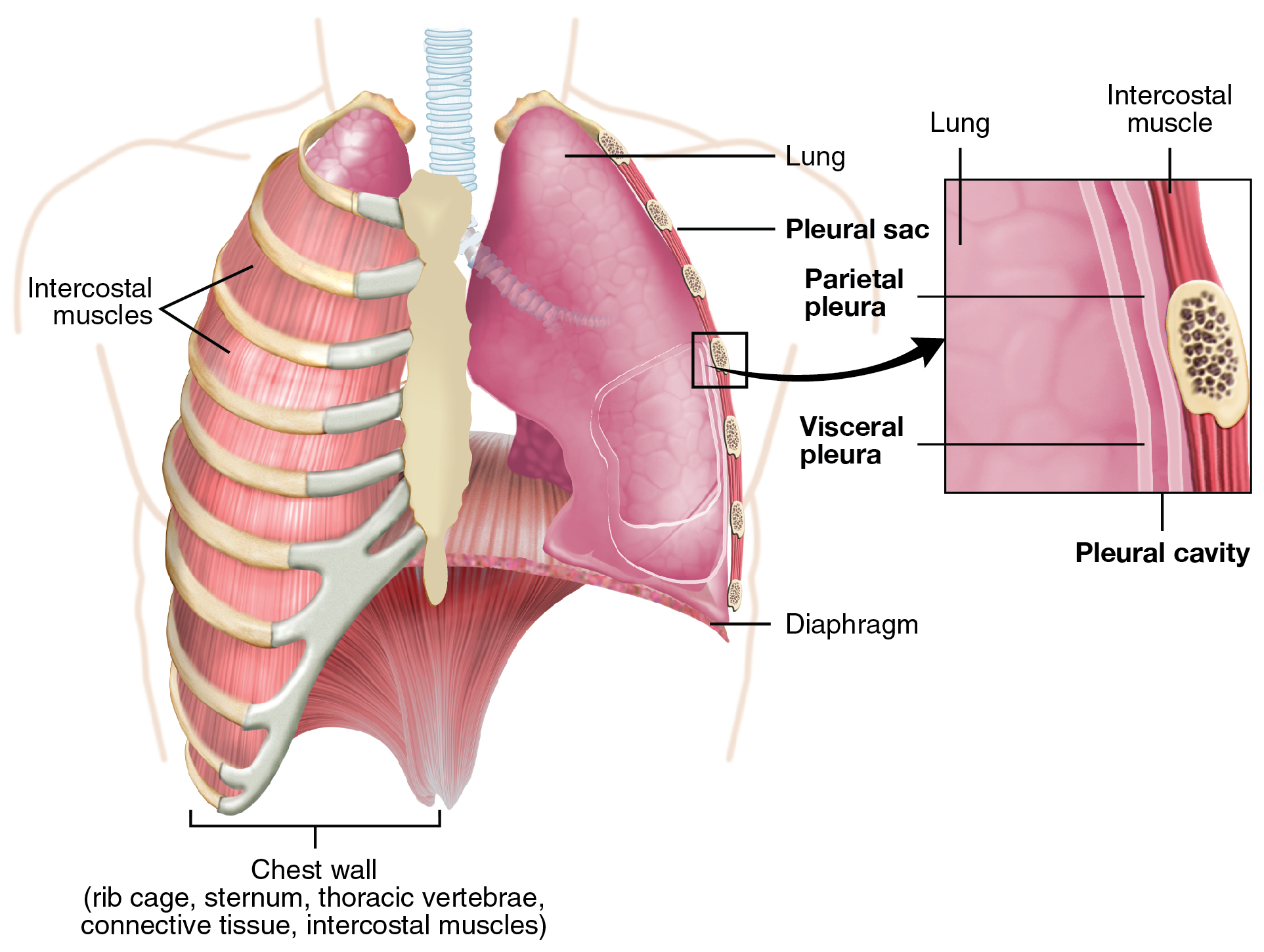
Diagram of anatomy of lung structure

== Anatomy ==
=== Respiratory system and cardiovascular system ===
Ventilation-Perfusion coupling involves organs of the respiratory system and cardiovascular system. The respiratory system and major airways participating in ventilation include the nostril, nasal cavity, mouth, pharynx, larynx, trachea, bronchus, and lungs. Within the lungs, the ventilation process specifically involves organs like respiratory bronchioles, alveolar ducts, alveolar sacs, and alveoli. For the perfusion process, the circulatory organs of the cardiovascular system such as the heart, pulmonary arteries, pulmonary veins, and alveolar capillaries are involved. The alveolar capillary specifically participates in perfusion to get in contact with the alveoli for the gas exchange and oxygen delivery to the body tissues.

=== Lung structure ===
The lung structure is important for the mechanism of ventilation-perfusion coupling. Pleura (plural: pleurae) is a single membrane surrounding the lung. It folds back to form two layers, and each layer is called parietal pleura and visceral pleura. The pleural cavity refers to the area between the parietal and visceral pleura, and pleural fluid fills the pleural cavity to lubricate the pleural surface and provide surface tension. These functions ensure the safety of the lungs and proper inspiration. The diaphragm and intercostal thoracic muscles alter the lung's pressure gradient, which generates ventilation driving force. The bottom region near the diaphragm is known as the 'base' of the lung, and the top of the lung near the upper lobe is referred to as the 'apex' of the lung.

== Physiology ==
An animated diagram that shows the change in thoracic volume during ventilation, and the exchange of oxygen and carbon dioxide between the pulmonary alveolus and capillaries during perfusion.

=== Ventilation ===
Ventilation (or breathing) is the air movement between the lungs and the atmospheric air, facilitating gas exchange . The air rushes into the lungs through inhalation (inspiration) and is pushed out through exhalation (expiration). During ventilation, the air movement is generated by the air pressure gradient between the atmosphere and the lungs produced by thoracic muscles and diaphragm contraction. Air is pushed in and out of the lungs as air flows from the higher pressured region to the lower pressured region. During inhalation, the diaphragm contraction causes an increase in the thoracic cavity volume. This decreases the pressure inside the lungs, forcing the air to flow into the lungs. During exhalation, the diaphragm relaxation causes a decrease in the thoracic cavity volume. The increased lung pressure pushes the air out of the lungs. The primary function of ventilation is the replacement of the stale gases in the lungs with oxygen-rich air through the removal of carbon dioxide for oxygenation of the blood. The oxygen is then supplied to the entire body through the circulatory system.

=== Perfusion ===
Perfusion is the delivery of oxygen-rich blood to the body tissues through the lymphatic system or circulatory system. The primary function of perfusion is the efficient removal of cellular waste and nutrition supply during gas exchange. Perfusion occurs during heart contraction when the oxygenated blood is pumped into the arteries. The arteries deliver the blood to the capillary bed of the tissues, where the oxygen is removed by diffusion. Oxygen in the alveoli is diffused down the concentration gradient and transported into the blood through the pulmonary capillaries. Once oxygen enters the bloodstream, it dissolves in plasma by binding to hemoglobin (Hb) of red blood cells and transported to body tissues. Then the deoxygenated blood returns to the heart via veins, and perfusion begins again after the blood is re-oxygenated through the ventilation process.

== Ventilation-perfusion ratio (V/Q ratio) ==
Ventilation–perfusion coupling is the relationship between ventilation and perfusion, represented by the ventilation-perfusion ratio(V/Q). Ventilation rate (V) is the total gas volume that enters and leaves the alveoli in a given amount of time, commonly measured per minute. To calculate the ventilation rate, the tidal volume (inhaled or exhaled gas volume during normal breath) is multiplied by the frequency of breaths per minute, which is represented by the formula:

Ventilation rate = Tidal volume (L) x breath per minute (breath/min) = L/min.

Perfusion rate (Q) is the total blood volume that enters the alveolar capillaries per unit time (1 minute) during the gas exchange. Therefore, the ventilation-perfusion ratio represents the volume of gas that enters the alveoli compared to the volume of blood that enters the alveoli per minute.

The ideal V/Q ratio is 1, the most efficient state of pulmonary function when the amount of oxygen entering the lungs equals the amount of oxygen delivered to the body. Furthermore, adequate achievement of ventilation and perfusion matching is essential as it ensures the continuous supply of oxygen and withdrawal of waste products from the body. Thus, strict regulation of ventilation and perfusion is needed for efficient gas exchange.

On average, 4 liters of oxygen (V) and 5 liters of blood (Q) enter the alveoli in a minute, thus the normal V/Q ratio is 0.8. It is considered abnormal when the ratio is greater or smaller than 0.8 and is referred to as ventilation-perfusion mismatch(V/Q mismatch). Further information on V/Q mismatch can be found in the clinical significance section below.

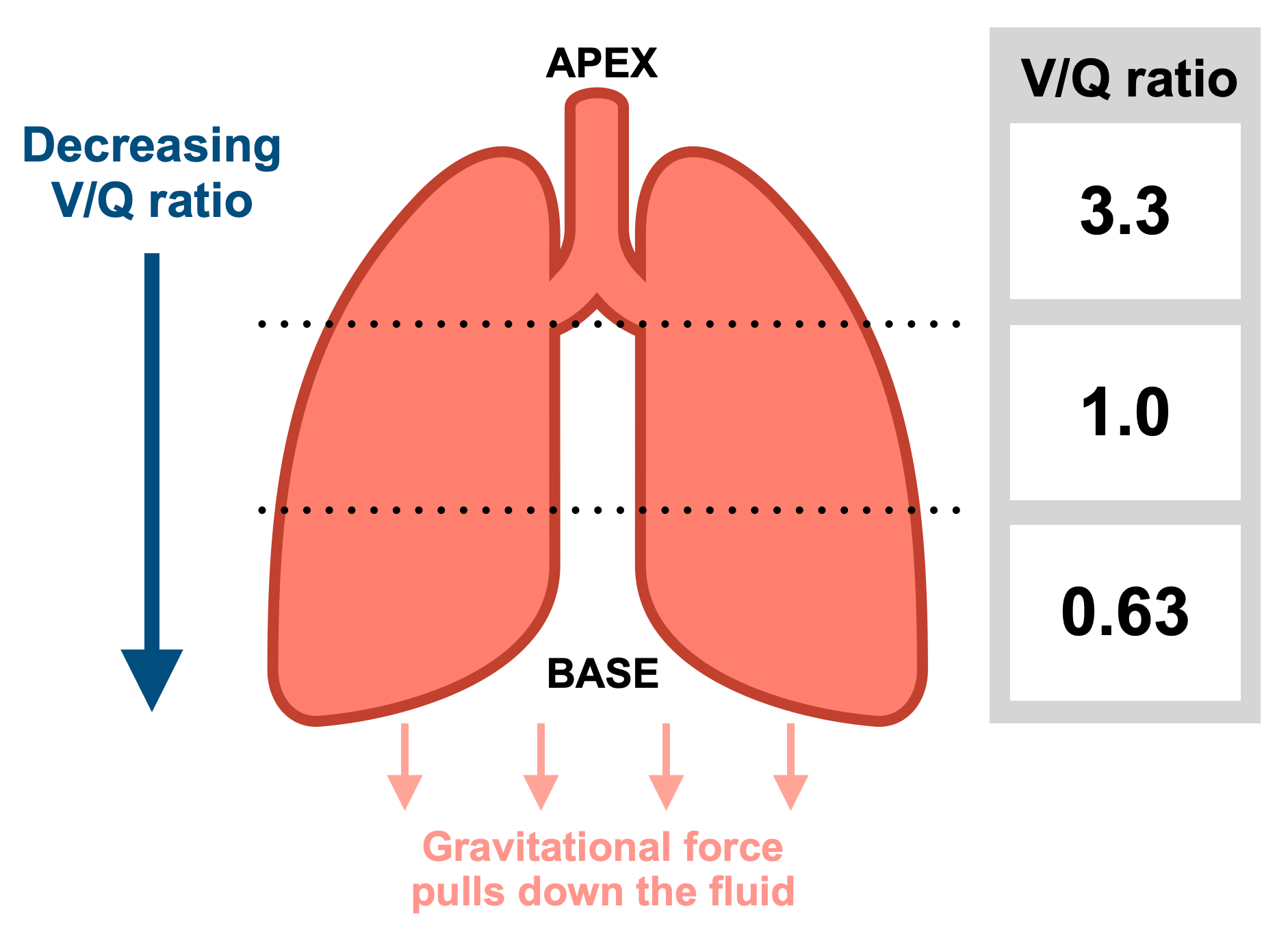
Diagram of the lungs showing regional variations in V/Q ratio

=== Regional variations ===
While the ideal V/Q ratio is 1, the ratio in the normal lungs of the healthy individual is approximately 0.8, meaning that the ventilation and perfusion do not equal perfectly. Due to gravity, lower lungs have a relatively greater amount of blood, and upper lungs(apex) have a relatively greater amount of air. Thus, the blood in the lower lungs(base) is not fully oxygenated, and the oxygen of air in the upper is not fully extracted, decreasing the V/Q ratio. Compared to the lungs' apex, the ventilation rate is 50% greater at the base. The V/Q ratio in the apex is roughly 3.3 and 0.63 in the base, which indicates that perfusion is greater than ventilation towards the base, and the ventilation rate is greater than perfusion towards the apex.

Towards the base of the lungs, the fluid volume in the pleural cavity increases due to gravity, resulting in greater intrapleural pressure. As a result, alveoli expand less and become more compliant at the base, improving ventilation. Perfusion also increases as gravity pulls down the blood towards the base. Overall, both ventilation and perfusion rate are enhanced towards the lungs' base. However, the perfusion rate rises more, resulting in decreased V/Q ratio. Towards the apex of the lungs, the hydrostatic pressure is reduced due to gravity, which lowers the blood flow, thus decreasing perfusion. Since ventilation exceeds perfusion, the V/Q ratio is increased at the apex of the lungs.

== Clinical significance ==
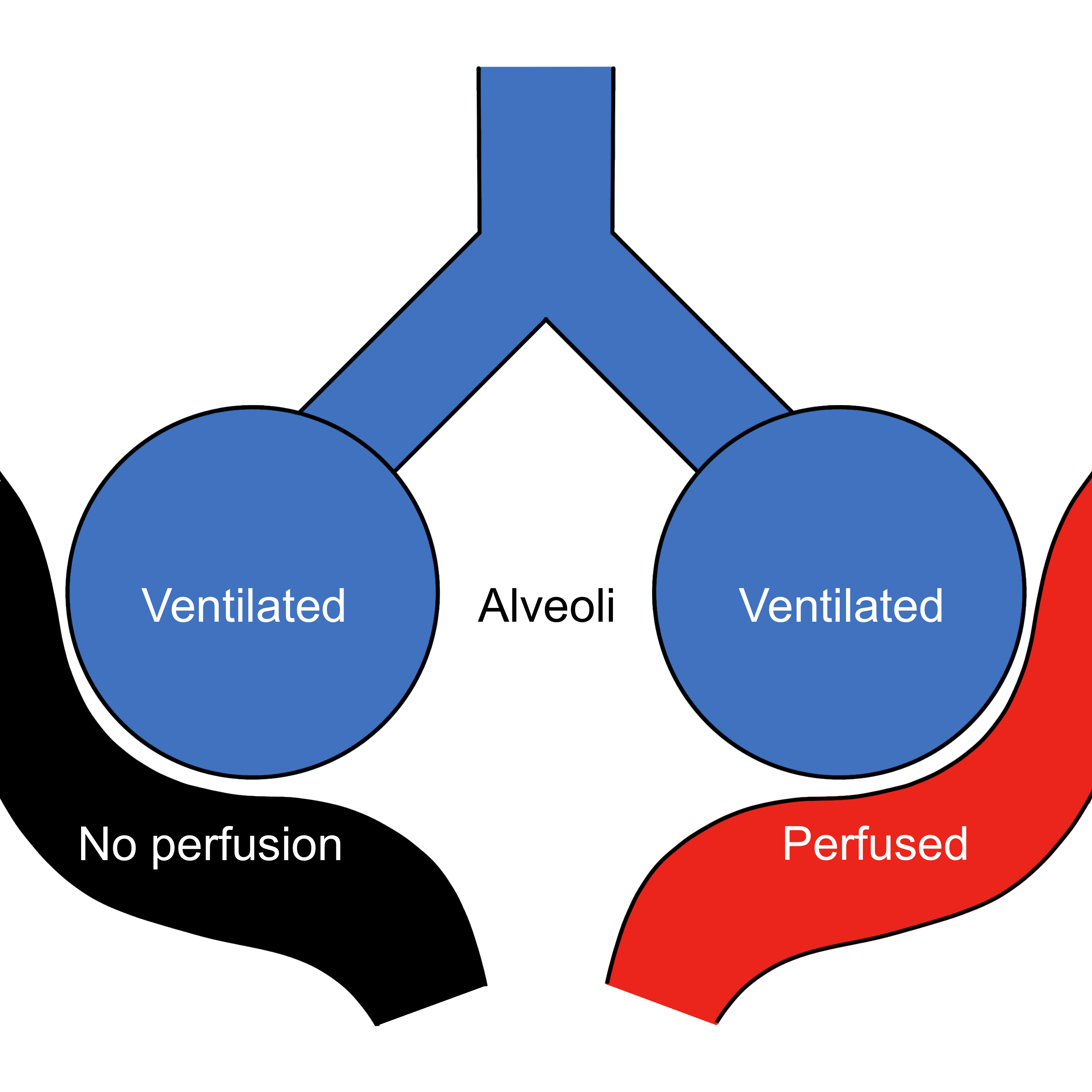
Diagram of alveolar dead space in alveoli and pulmonary capillary

When the ventilation-perfusion ratio is abnormally higher or lower than the normal range (0.8), it is called the ventilation-perfusion mismatch, which may cause a significant impact on health.

=== Ventilation-perfusion Mismatch (V/Q mismatch) ===
There are two types of V/Q mismatch.

Firstly, dead space occurs when the ventilation exceeds perfusion due to deficient perfusion. Dead space refers to the volume not taking part in gas exchange. Alveolar dead space and insufficient perfusion result in a V/Q ratio above 0.8 with decreased fresh oxygen in the alveoli. This might have been caused by blood clotting, heart failure, pulmonary emphysema, or damage in alveolar capillaries.

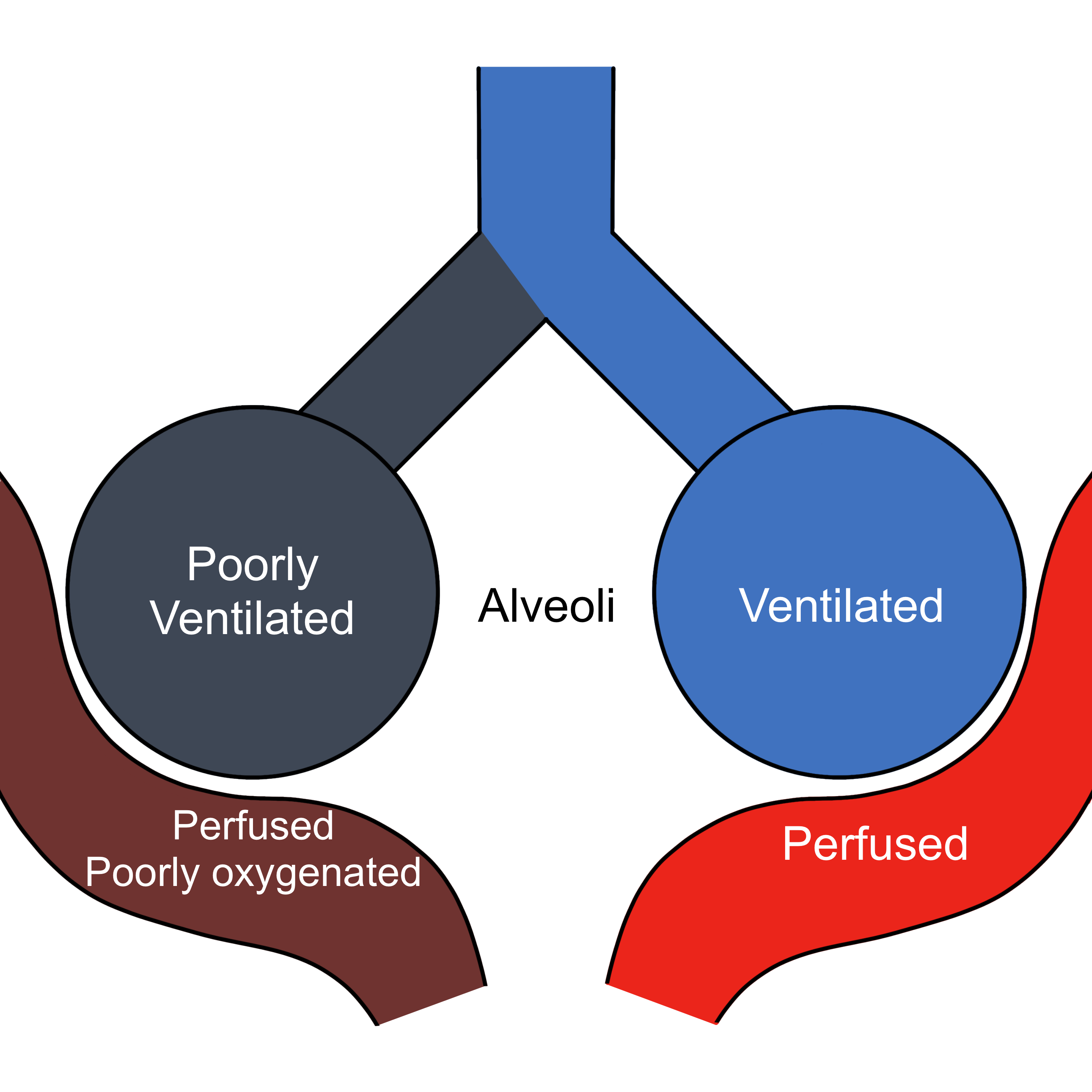
Diagram of pulmonary shunt in alveoli and pulmonary capillary

Secondly, the pulmonary shunt is caused by zero or low V/Q ratio due to insufficient ventilation and excess perfusion. Improper ventilation lowers blood oxygenation and oxygen supply to body tissues. Although 100% oxygen is inspired, a pulmonary shunt prevents oxygen from being delivered to the alveoli and blood capillaries. It likely results in hypoxemia (low oxygen level), and the common symptoms of ventilation-perfusion mismatch include dizziness, headache, and fatigue. Respiratory symptoms like wheezing, rapid breathing, and shortness of breath may make breathing harder. Moreover, the patient may experience blue or grey-colored skin, reduced energy level, spatial disorientation, or confusion. Low V/Q ratio may have been caused by pneumonia, pulmonary edema, asthma, or the blockage of the bronchus.

=== Cause ===
Many factors contribute to causing V/Q mismatch. However, the most common causes can be divided into lung disease, cardiac shunt, and others.

==== Lung diseases ====
COPD (chronic obstructive pulmonary disease) is a chronic lung condition that groups breathing issues caused by obstructive airflow. Difficulty in breathing results in low ventilation(low V/Q ratio) at the alveolar level, and its symptoms include breathing difficulty, chronic cough, and wheezing. Smoking (long-term exposure to chemical irritants) can cause COPD, increasing the risk of lung cancer and heart disease.

Asthma is a common inflammatory disease causing the airway to swell and disturb breathing and ventilation(low V/A ratio). The cause is unrevealed, but allergens such as pollen, mold, respiratory infections, and air pollutants(cigarette smoke) are potential stimulators. Symptoms are shortness of breath, chest tightness, coughing, and wheezing.

Pulmonary embolism is blood clots occurring in the lungs. Restricted blood flow in the pulmonary circulation results in alveoli ventilated but not perfused, thus, increasing the V/Q ratio and decreasing gas exchange. It can cause hypoxemia(low oxygen level) and damage part of the lung, which may be treated with anticoagulants. Common symptoms are shortness of breath, chest pain, anxiety, irregular heartbeat, heart racing, headache, memory loss, and confusion in the brain.

ARDS, pneumonia, chronic bronchitis, pulmonary edema, and airway obstruction are lung diseases that also commonly cause a ventilation-perfusion mismatch. Lung diseases abnormally alter the ventilation or perfusion and disrupt the maintenance of the normal V/Q ratio.

==== Cardiac Right-to-left shunt ====
Deoxygenated blood typically moves to the lungs for oxygenation(fresh oxygen supply). The right-to-left shunt is an abnormal blood circulation that enables deoxygenated blood to pass from the right side to the left side of the heart and skips the lungs. Thus, no oxygenation occurs, and reduced gas exchange results in hypoxemia as fresh oxygen cannot reach the shunted blood. It results in ventilation without perfusion and a higher V/Q ratio.

==== Others ====
Long exposure to cigarette smoke induces airway inflammation and enlargement, which eventually restricts airflow and associates a high risk of V/Q mismatch. Also, obstructive sleep apnea is a sleep-related breathing disorder experiencing reduced breathing while asleep due to obstruction of the upper airway. It typically has a higher risk in people with obesity. Symptoms are loud snoring, choking, breathing interruptions, headaches, and drowsiness when awake.

=== Treatment ===
Several therapeutic pathways are developed to treat V/Q mismatch. The most common treatments are bronchodilators and oxygen therapy. Bronchodilators improve breathing by relaxing lung muscles or widening the airways. It is usually applied through inhalers and is mostly used to treat asthma and chronic obstructive pulmonary disease. Oxygen therapy provides supplemental pure oxygen to improve the low blood oxygen level to ease breathing. It is useful for patients experiencing sleep apnea, pneumonia, and asthma. Corticosteroids, antibiotics, pulmonary rehabilitation therapy, anticoagulants, and surgery can also serve as a medical treatment for ventilation-perfusion mismatch-related symptoms and diseases. Treatment may last for the short or long-term.

=== Diagnosis ===
A pulmonary ventilation-perfusion scan (lung V/Q scan) can be used to diagnose the V/Q mismatch. A ventilation scan is used to measure airflow spread and a perfusion scan for blood flow distribution in the lungs. A radioactive tracer is used to scan the whole lung and the ventilation and perfusion function.
