= Hepatopulmonary syndrome =

Shortness of breath and low blood oxygen due to liver disease

- Specialty: Hepatology

In medicine, hepatopulmonary syndrome is a syndrome of shortness of breath and hypoxemia (low oxygen levels in the blood of the arteries) caused by vasodilation (broadening of the blood vessels) in the lungs of patients with liver disease. Dyspnea and hypoxemia are worse in the upright position (which is called platypnea and orthodeoxia, respectively).

== Pathophysiology ==
The hepatopulmonary syndrome results from the formation of microscopic intrapulmonary arteriovenous dilatations in patients with both chronic, and far less commonly acute liver failure. The mechanism is unknown but is thought to be due to increased liver production or decreased liver clearance of vasodilators, possibly involving nitric oxide.

The dilation of these blood vessels causes overperfusion relative to ventilation, leading to ventilation-perfusion mismatch and hypoxemia. There is an increased gradient between the partial pressure of oxygen in the alveoli of the lung and adjacent arteries (alveolar-arterial [A-a] gradient) while breathing room air. Patients with HPS have platypnea-orthodeoxia syndrome (POS); that is, because intrapulmonary vascular dilations (IPVDs) predominate in the bases of the lungs, standing worsens hypoxemia (orthodeoxia)/dyspnea (platypnea) and the supine position improves oxygenation as blood is redistributed from the bases to the apices. Additionally, late in cirrhosis, it is common to develop high output failure, which would lead to less time in capillaries per red blood cell, exacerbating the hypoxemia.

== Diagnosis ==
The hepatopulmonary syndrome is suspected in any patient with known liver disease who reports dyspnea (particularly platypnea). Patients with clinically significant symptoms should undergo pulse oximetry. If the syndrome is advanced, arterial blood gasses should be measured on air. Hepatopulmonary syndrome (HPS) consists of the triad of liver dysfunction, otherwise unexplained hypoxemia, and intrapulmonary vascular dilation (IPVD).

A useful diagnostic test is contrast echocardiography. Intravenous microbubbles (> 10 micrometers in diameter) from agitated normal saline that are normally obstructed by pulmonary capillaries (normally <8 to 15 micrometers) rapidly transit the lung and appear in the left atrium of the heart within 7 heart beats. Similarly, intravenous technetium (99mTc) albumin aggregated may transit the lungs and appear in the kidney and brain. Pulmonary angiography may reveal diffusely fine or blotchy vascular configuration. The distinction has to be made with an intracardiac right-to-left shunt.

== Treatment ==
Currently the only definitive treatment is liver transplantation. Alternative treatments such as supplemental oxygen or somatostatin to inhibit vasodilation remain anecdotal.

== Prognosis ==
With liver transplantation, the 5 year survival rate is 74%, which is comparable to patients who undergo liver transplants who do not suffer from hepatopulmonary syndrome.

== See also ==
- Gastric antral vascular ectasia
- Hepatitis
- Hepatorenal syndrome
