= Pulmonary shunt =

Bypass of the pulmonary capillaries by deoxygenated blood

A pulmonary shunt is the passage of deoxygenated blood from the right side of the heart to the left without participation in gas exchange in the pulmonary capillaries. It is a pathological condition that results when the alveoli of parts of the lungs are perfused with blood as normal, but ventilation (the supply of air) fails to supply the perfused region. In other words, the ventilation/perfusion ratio (the ratio of air reaching the alveoli to blood perfusing them) of those areas is zero.

A pulmonary shunt often occurs when the alveoli fill with fluid, causing parts of the lung to be unventilated although they are still perfused.

Intrapulmonary shunting is the main cause of hypoxemia (inadequate blood oxygen) in pulmonary edema and conditions such as pneumonia in which the lungs become consolidated. The shunt fraction is the percentage of cardiac output that is not completely oxygenated.

In pathological conditions such as pulmonary contusion, the shunt fraction is significantly greater and even breathing 100% oxygen does not fully oxygenate the blood.

Intrapulmonary shunt is specifically shunting where some of the blood flow through the lungs is not properly oxygenated. Other shunts may occur where venous and arterial blood mix but completely bypass the lungs (extrapulmonary shunt).

== Anatomical shunt ==
If every alveolus was perfectly ventilated and all blood from the right ventricle were to pass through fully functional pulmonary capillaries, and there was unimpeded diffusion across the alveolar and capillary membrane, there would be a theoretical maximum blood gas exchange, and the alveolar P_{O_{2}} and arterial P_{O_{2}} would be the same. The formula for shunt describes the deviation from this ideal.

A normal lung is imperfectly ventilated and perfused, and a small degree of intrapulmonary shunting is normal. Anatomical shunting occurs when blood supply to the lungs via the pulmonary arteries is returned via the pulmonary veins without passing through the pulmonary capillaries, thereby bypassing alveolar gas exchange. Capillary shunting is blood that passes through capillaries of unventilated alveoli or deoxygenated blood flowing directly from pulmonary arterioles to nearby pulmonary veins through anastomoses, bypassing the alveolar capillaries. In addition, some of the smallest cardiac veins drain directly into the left ventricle of the human heart. This drainage of deoxygenated blood straight into the systemic circulation is why the arterial P_{O_{2}} is normally slightly lower than the alveolar P_{O_{2}}, known as the alveolar–arterial gradient, a useful clinical sign in determining the cause of hypoxemia.

The alveolar-arterial (A-a) gradient measures the difference between oxygen concentrations in the alveoli and the arterial system. This is an important clinical method of narrowing the differential diagnosis for hypoxemia. The gradient calculation is as follows:

$$A-a Gradient = PAO2 - PaO2$$

Where PAO2 represents the alveolar oxygen pressure and PaO2 represents the arterial oxygen pressure.

The alveolar oxygen pressure is not easily measured directly and is therefor estimated using the alveolar gas equation.

$$PAO2 = (Patm - PH2O) FiO2 - PaCO2/RQ$$

Where PAO2 represents alveolar oxygen pressure, Patm represents atmospheric pressure (at sea level 760 mm Hg), PH2O represents partial pressure of water (approximately 45 mm Hg), FiO2 represents the fraction of inspired oxygen (for room air, 0.21), PaCO2 represents the partial pressure of carbon dioxide in the alveoli (in normal physiological conditions around 40 to 45 mmHg), and where RQ represents the respiratory quotient, which is generally assumed to be 0.8. The arterial oxygen pressure (PaO2) and arterial carbon dioxide pressure (PaCO2) can be directly measured using an arterial blood gas test (ABG) or estimated via the venous blood gas test (VBG), and since carbon dioxide rapidly diffuses in and out of the lungs, arterial carbon dioxide pressure and alveolar carbon dioxide pressure are effectively equal.

The A-a gradient should theoretically be zero in a healthy person, but almost never is. A normal person will have an A-a gradient estimated by: Normal Gradient = (Age in years/4) + 4. If the A-a gradient is significantly higher than the result of this equation, the person likely has a disorder of the alveoli, causing oxygen to be unable to diffuse into the blood. If the person has a normal A-a gradient but still has hypoxemia, then there is probably a cause unrelated to the alveoli, such as hypoventilation, obstructive lung disease, or shunting.

== Pathophysiology ==
Efficient pulmonary gas exchange depends on matching alveolar ventilation (V) to pulmonary perfusion (Q), often expressed as the ventilation–perfusion (V/Q) ratio. A pulmonary shunt represents the extreme end of V/Q mismatch in which perfusion persists through lung units that receive little or no ventilation (V/Q≈0), so venous blood reaches the left heart without being oxygenated in the alveoli (venous admixture).

Intrapulmonary shunting occurs when alveoli are perfused but not ventilated, such as with alveolar collapse (atelectasis) or when airspaces are filled with fluid or exudate (e.g., pneumonia, pulmonary edema, or acute respiratory distress syndrome). Right-to-left shunt can also occur via anatomic pathways that bypass gas-exchanging capillaries, including intracardiac defects and pulmonary arteriovenous communications/malformations.

Local hypoxia normally triggers hypoxic pulmonary vasoconstriction (HPV), a response of small pulmonary arteries that reduces perfusion to poorly ventilated lung regions and diverts blood flow toward better ventilated units, improving overall V/Q matching. When shunt is large or HPV is impaired, arterial hypoxemia worsens.

Hypoxemia caused by V/Q mismatch generally improves with supplemental oxygen, but true shunt shows a comparatively poor response because part of the cardiac output bypasses ventilated alveoli. For this reason, breathing 100% oxygen (a hyperoxia test) can be used to help estimate the shunt fraction: after sufficient time on 100% oxygen, contributions from V/Q mismatch and diffusion limitation are minimized, and persistent arterial deoxygenation largely reflects shunted blood (with a small contribution from very low V/Q units). Hypercapnia is uncommon until the shunt fraction is large, because carbon dioxide elimination is often maintained by increased overall ventilation.

In contrast, dead space represents the opposite extreme (very high V/Q), where ventilation is present but perfusion is reduced or absent, as can occur in pulmonary embolism. In such cases, hypoxemia commonly reflects redistribution of blood flow and the development of low V/Q units elsewhere in the lung rather than the dead-space regions themselves.

== See also ==
- Cardiac shunt
- Shunt equation
