= Multiple inert gas elimination technique =

Medical technique

The multiple inert gas elimination technique (MIGET) is a medical technique used mainly in pulmonology that involves measuring the concentrations of various infused, inert gases in mixed venous blood, arterial blood, and expired gas of a subject. The technique quantifies true shunt, physiological dead space ventilation, ventilation versus blood flow (V_{A}/Q) ratios, and diffusion limitation.

== Background ==
Hypoxemia is generally attributed to one of four processes: hypoventilation, shunt (right to left), diffusion limitation, and ventilation/perfusion (V_{A}/Q) inequality. Moreover, there are also "extrapulmonary" factors that can contribute to fluctuations in arterial PO_{2}.

There are several measures of hypoxemia that can be assessed, but there are various limitations associated with each. It was for this reason that the MIGET was developed, to overcome the shortcomings of previous methods.

== Theoretical basis ==
Steady-state gas exchange in the lungs obeys the principles of conservation of mass. This leads to the ventilation/perfusion equation for oxygen:

$$V_A/Q=8.63 \times \frac{C_{c'}\ce{O2} - C_v\ce{O2}}{P_I\ce{O2} - P_A\ce{O2}}$$

and for carbon dioxide:

$$V_A/Q=8.63 \times \frac{C_v\ce{CO2} - C_{c'}\ce{CO2}}{P_A\ce{CO2}}$$

where:

- $C_{c'}$ denotes the end-capillary concentration of the gas (mL/dL),
- $C_v$ denotes the mixed venous concentration of the gas (mL/dL),
- $P_I$ denotes the inspired partial pressure of the gas (mmHg), and
- $P_A$ denotes the alveolar partial pressure of the gas (mmHg)
- $V_A/Q$ denotes the ratio of alveolar ventilation to cardiac output

For the purposes of utilizing the MIGET, the equations have been generalized for an inert gas (IG):

$$V_A/Q = 8.63 \times \ce{solubility} \times \frac {P_V\ce{IG} - P_{C'}\ce{IG}}{P_A\ce{IG}}$$

where:

- solubility is the ratio of concentration to partial pressure expressed in mL of gas dissolved per dL of blood per mmHg of the gas in blood

Assuming diffusion equilibration is complete for the inert gas, dropping the subscript IG, and substituting the blood-gas partition coefficient (λ) renders:

$$V_A/Q = {\lambda} \times \frac{P_v - P_A}{P_A}$$

Rearranging:

$$P_A/P_v = \frac{{\lambda}}{{\lambda} + V_A/Q} = P_{c'}/P_v$$

where:

- $P_v$ denotes the mixed venous partial pressure of the gas (mmHg)
- $P_{c'}$ denotes the end-capillary partial pressure of the gas (mmHg)

This equation is the foundation for the MIGET, and it demonstrates that the fraction of inert gas not eliminated from the blood via the lung is a function of the partition coefficient and the V_{A}/Q ratio. This equation operates under the presumption that the lung is perfectly homogenous. In this model, retention (R) is measured from the ratio $P_A/P_v$. Stated mathematically:

$$R = \frac{\lambda}{\lambda+V_A/Q}$$

From this equation, we can measure the levels of each inert gas retained in the blood. The relationship between retention (R) and $V_A/Q$ can be summarized as follows: As $V_A/Q$ for a given λ increases, R decreases; however, this relationship between $V_A/Q$ and R is the most obvious at values of $V_A/Q$ between ten times higher and lower than a gas's λ. Beyond this, however, it is possible to measure the concentrations of the inert gases in the expired gas from the subject. The ratio of the mixed expired concentration to the mixed venous concentration has been termed excretion (E) and describes the ventilation to regions of varying $V_A/Q$. When taken together:

$$V_{IG} = V_E \times E = \lambda \times Q_T \times [1-R]$$

where:

- V_{IG} denotes volume of an inert gas eliminated per minute (mL/min)
- $V_E$ denotes minute ventilation (mL/min)
- $Q_T$ denotes cardiac output (mL/min)

When observing a collection of alveoli in which PO_{2} and PCO_{2} are uniform, local alveolar ventilation and local blood flow define $V_A/Q$:

$$V_A = Q \times V_A/Q$$

From these equations it can be deduced that to have knowledge of either retention or excretion implies knowledge of the other. Moreover, a similar understanding exists for the relationship between the distribution of blood flow and the distribution of ventilation.

== Limitations ==
The data produced by the MIGET is an approximation of the distribution of $V_A/Q$ ratios across the entire lung. It has been estimated that nearly 100,000 gas exchange units exist in the human lung; this could lead to a theoretical maximum of VA/Q compartments as high as 100,000, in that case.
