= VD/VT =

Ratio of physiologic dead space over tidal volume

In medicine, the ratio of physiologic dead space over tidal volume (V_{D}/V_{T}) is a routine measurement, expressing the ratio of dead-space ventilation (V_{D}) to tidal ventilation (V_{T}), as in physiologic research or the care of patients with respiratory disease.

== Equation ==
$$\frac{V_D}{V_T} = \frac{P_a \ce{CO2} - P_E \ce{CO2}}{P_a \ce{CO2}}$$
