= Cardiac shunt =

Abnormal heart blood flow pattern

In cardiology, a cardiac shunt is a pattern of blood flow in the heart that deviates from the normal circuit of the circulatory system. It may be described as right-left, left-right or bidirectional, or as systemic-to-pulmonary or pulmonary-to-systemic. The direction may be controlled by left and/or right heart pressure, a biological or artificial heart valve or both. The presence of a shunt may also affect left and/or right heart pressure either beneficially or detrimentally.

== Terminology ==
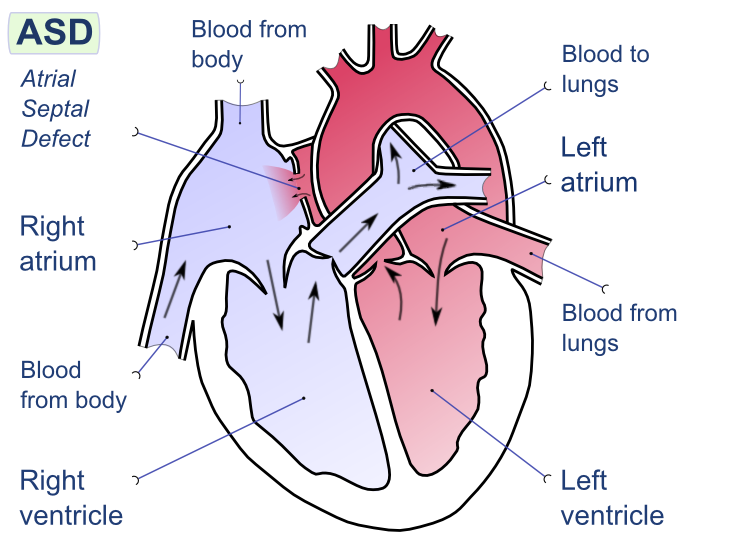
Atrial septal defect with left-to-right shunt

The left and right sides of the heart are named from a dorsal view, i.e., looking at the heart from the back or from the perspective of the person whose heart it is. There are four chambers in a heart: an atrium (upper) and a ventricle (lower) on both the left and right sides. In mammals and birds, blood from the body goes to the right side of the heart first. Blood enters the upper right atrium, is pumped down to the right ventricle and from there to the lungs via the pulmonary artery. Blood going to the lungs is called the pulmonary circulation. When the blood returns to the heart from the lungs via the pulmonary vein, it goes to the left side of the heart, entering the upper left atrium. Blood is then pumped to the lower left ventricle and from there out of the heart to the body via the aorta. This is called the systemic circulation. A cardiac shunt is when blood follows a pattern that deviates from the systemic circulation, i.e., from the body to the right atrium, down to the right ventricle, to the lungs, from the lungs to the left atrium, down to the left ventricle and then out of the heart back to the systemic circulation.

A left-to-right shunt is when blood from the left side of the heart goes to the right side of the heart. This can occur either through a hole in the ventricular or atrial septum that divides the left and the right heart or through a hole in the walls of the arteries leaving the heart, called great vessels. Left-to-right shunts occur when the systolic blood pressure in the left heart is higher than the right heart, which is the normal condition in birds and mammals.

== Congenital shunts in humans ==
The most common congenital heart defects (CHDs) which cause shunting are atrial septal defects (ASD), patent foramen ovale (PFO), ventricular septal defects (VSD), and patent ductus arteriosi (PDA). In isolation, these defects may be asymptomatic, or they may produce symptoms which can range from mild to severe, and which can either have an acute or a delayed onset. However, these shunts are often present in combination with other defects; in these cases, they may still be asymptomatic, mild or severe, acute or delayed, but they may also work to counteract the negative symptoms caused by another defect (as with d-Transposition of the great arteries).

== Acquired shunts in human ==
=== Biological ===
Some acquired shunts are modifications of congenital ones: a balloon septostomy can enlarge a foramen ovale (if performed on a newborn), PFO or ASD; or prostaglandin can be administered to a newborn to prevent the ductus arteriosus from closing. Biological tissues may also be used to construct artificial passages.

Evaluation can be done during a cardiac catheterization with a "shunt run" by taking blood samples from superior vena cava (SVC), inferior vena cava (IVC), right atrium, right ventricle, pulmonary artery, and system arterial. Abrupt increases in oxygen saturation support a left-to-right shunt and lower than normal systemic arterial oxygen saturation supports a right-to-left shunt.

Samples from the SVC & IVC are used to calculate mixed venous oxygen saturation using the Flamm formula

$$S_vO_2 = \frac{3}{4} \times SVC + \frac{1}{4} \times IVC$$

and Qp:Qs ratio

$$Qp:Qs = \frac{\text{change in oxygen concentration across the pulmonary circulation}}{\text{change in oxygen concentration across the systemic circulation}} = \frac{P_V - P_A}{S_A - S_V}$$

where $P_V$ is the pulmonary vein, $P_A$ is the pulmonary artery, $S_A$ is the systemic arterial, and $S_V$ is the mixed-venous The Qp:Qs ratio is based upon the Fick principle and it is reduced to the above equation and eliminates the need to know cardiac output and hemoglobin concentration.

=== Mechanical ===
Mechanical shunts such as the Blalock-Taussig shunt are used in some cases of CHD to control blood flow or blood pressure.

== Reptile ==
All reptiles have the capacity for cardiac shunts.
