= Bohr equation =

Equation describing the amount of physiological dead space in a person's lungs

The Bohr equation, named after Danish physician Christian Bohr (1855–1911), describes the amount of physiological dead space in a person's lungs. This is given as a ratio of dead space to tidal volume. It differs from anatomical dead space as measured by Fowler's method as it includes alveolar dead space.

== Description ==
The Bohr equation is used to quantify the ratio of physiological dead space to the total tidal volume, and gives an indication of the extent of wasted ventilation. The original formulation by Bohr, required measurement of the alveolar partial pressure P_{A}. $P_e \mathrm{CO}_2$ is the partial pressure of carbon dioxide in the expelled air.

$$\frac{V_\text{d}}{V_\text{t}} = \frac{\text{P}_\text{A} \text{CO}_2 - \text{P}_\text{e} \text{CO}_2}{\text{P}_\text{A}\text{CO}_2}$$

This equation is equivalent to mass balance:
$$\text{Exchanged CO}_2 = \text{Exhaled CO}_2$$
$$(V_\text{t} - V_\text{d}) \text{P}_\text{A} \text{CO}_2 = V_\text{t} \text{P}_\text{e} \text{CO}_2$$

The modification by Enghoff replaced the mixed alveolar partial pressure of CO_{2} with the arterial partial pressure of that gas.

The Bohr equation, with Enghoff's modification, is commonly stated as follows:

$$\frac{V_\text{d}}{V_\text{t}} = \frac{\text{P}_\text{a} \text{CO}_2 - \text{P}_\text{e} \text{CO}_2}{\text{P}_\text{a} \text{CO}_2}$$

Here $V_{d}$ is the volume of the exhale that arises from the physiological dead space of the lung and $V_{t}$ is the tidal volume;

$P_{a\,\ce{CO2}}$ is the partial pressure of carbon dioxide in the arterial blood, and
$P_{e\,\ce{CO2}}$ is the partial pressure of carbon dioxide in the average expired (exhaled) air.

== Derivation ==
Its derivation is based on the fact that only the ventilated gases involved in gas exchange ($V_A$) will produce CO_{2}. Because the total tidal volume ($V_T$) is made up of $V_A+V_d$ (alveolar volume + dead space volume), we can substitute $V_A$ for $V_T-V_d$.

Initially, Bohr tells us V_{T} = V_{d} + V_{A}. The Bohr equation helps us find the amount of any expired gas, CO_{2}, N_{2}, O_{2}, etc.

In this case we will focus on CO_{2}.

Defining F_{e} as the fraction of CO_{2} in the average expired breath, F_{A} as the fraction of CO_{2} in the perfused alveolar volume, and F_{d} as the CO_{2} makeup of the unperfused (and thus 'dead') region of the lung;

V_{T} x F_{e} = ( V_{d} x F_{d} ) + (V_{A} x F_{A} ).

This states that all of the CO_{2} expired comes from two regions, the dead space volume and the alveolar volume.
If we suppose that F_{d} = 0 (since carbon dioxide's concentration in air is normally negligible), then we can say that:

$V_T \times F_e = V_A \times F_A$ Where F_{e} = Fraction expired CO_{2}, and F_{A} = Alveolar fraction of CO_{2}.

$V_T \times F_e = (V_T - V_d) \times F_A$ Substituted as above.

$V_T \times F_e = V_T \times F_A - V_d \times F_A$ Multiply out the brackets.

$V_d \times F_A = V_T \times F_A - V_T \times F_e$ Rearranging.

$$V_d \times F_A = V_T \times (F_A - F_e)$$

$V_d/V_T = \frac{F_A - F_e}{F_A}$ Divide by V_{T} and by F_{A}.

The only source of CO_{2} is the alveolar space where gas exchange with blood takes place. Thus the alveolar fractional component of CO_{2}, F_{A}, will always be higher than the average CO_{2} content of the expired air because of a non-zero dead space volume V_{d}, thus the above equation will always yield a positive number.

Where P_{tot} is the total pressure, we obtain:

- $F_A \times P_{tot} = P_A\ce{CO2}$ and
- $F_e \times P_{tot} = P_e\ce{CO2}$

Therefore:

$$\begin{align}
V_d/V_T &= \frac{(F_A\ce{CO2} - F_e\ce{CO2}) \times P_{tot}}{F_A\ce{CO2} \times P_{tot}}\\
& = \frac{P_A\ce{CO2} - P_e\ce{CO2}}{P_A\ce{CO2}}
\end{align}$$

A common step is to then presume that the partial pressure of carbon dioxide in the end-tidal exhaled air is in equilibrium with that gas' tension in the blood that leaves the alveolar capillaries of the lung.
