= Ventilation/perfusion ratio =

Cardiorespiratory property

In respiratory physiology, the ventilation/perfusion ratio (V/Q ratio) is a ratio used to assess the efficiency and adequacy of the ventilation-perfusion coupling and thus the matching of two variables:

- V – ventilation – the air that reaches the alveoli
- Q – perfusion – the blood that reaches the alveoli via the capillaries

The V/Q ratio can therefore be defined as the ratio of the amount of air reaching the alveoli per minute to the amount of blood reaching the alveoli per minute—a ratio of volumetric flow rates. These two variables, V and Q, constitute the main determinants of the blood oxygen (O_{2}) and carbon dioxide (CO_{2}) concentration.

The V/Q ratio can be measured with a two-part ventilation/perfusion scan (V/Q scan). Using a small amount of inhaled or injected radioactive material called a tracer for visualization, a V/Q scan is a type of nuclear medical imaging that allows for localization and characterization of blood flow (perfusion scan) and measurement of airflow (ventilation scan) within the lungs. V/Q scans are primarily used for the diagnosis of a blood clot in the lungs, called a pulmonary embolism.

A V/Q mismatch can cause Type 1 respiratory failure.

== Physiology ==
Ideally, the oxygen provided via ventilation would be just enough to saturate the blood fully. In the typical adult, 1 litre of blood can hold about 200 mL of oxygen; 1 litre of dry air has about 210 mL of oxygen. Therefore, under these conditions, the ideal ventilation perfusion ratio would be about 0.95. If one were to consider humidified air (with less oxygen), then the ideal v/q ratio would be in the vicinity of 1.0, thus leading to concept of ventilation-perfusion equality or ventilation-perfusion matching. This matching may be assessed in the lung as a whole, or in individual or in sub-groups of gas-exchanging units in the lung. On the other side Ventilation-perfusion mismatch is the term used when the ventilation and the perfusion of a gas exchanging unit are not matched.

The actual values in the lung vary depending on the position within the lung. If taken as a whole, the typical value is approximately 0.8.

Because the lung is centered vertically around the heart, part of the lung is superior to the heart, and part is inferior. This has a major impact on the V/Q ratio:

- apex of lung – higher
- base of lung – lower

In a subject standing in orthostatic position (upright) the apex of the lung shows higher V/Q ratio, while at the base of the lung the ratio is lower but nearer to the optimal value for reaching adequate blood oxygen concentrations. While both ventilation and perfusion increase going from the apex to the base, perfusion increases to a greater degree than ventilation, lowering the V/Q ratio at the base of the lungs. The principal factor involved in the creation of this V/Q gradient between the apex and the base of the lung is gravity (this is why V/Q ratios change in positions other than the orthostatic position).

=== Ventilation ===
Gravity and the weight of the lung act on ventilation by increasing pleural pressure at the base (making it less negative) and thus reducing the alveolar volume. The lowest part of the lung in relation to gravity is called the dependent region. In the dependent region smaller alveolar volumes mean the alveoli are more compliant (more distensible) and so capable of more oxygen exchange. The apex, though showing a higher oxygen partial pressure, ventilates less efficiently since its compliance is lower and so smaller volumes are exchanged.

=== Perfusion ===
The impact of gravity on pulmonary perfusion expresses itself as the hydrostatic pressure of the blood passing through the branches of the pulmonary artery in order to reach the apical and basal areas of the lungs, acting synergistically with the pressure developed by the right ventricle. Thus at the apex of the lung the resulting pressure can be insufficient for developing a flow (which can be sustained only by the negative pressure generated by venous flow towards the left atrium) or even for preventing the collapse of the vascular structures surrounding the alveoli, while the base of the lung shows an intense flow due to the higher pressure.

== Pathology ==
=== Extreme alterations of V/Q ===
- An area with perfusion but no ventilation (and thus a V/Q of zero) is termed shunt.
- An area with ventilation but no perfusion (and thus a V/Q undefined though approaching infinity) is termed "dead space".

Of note, few conditions constitute "pure" shunt or dead space as they would be incompatible with life, and thus the term V/Q mismatch is more appropriate for conditions in between these two extremes.

=== Pathophysiology ===
- A lower V/Q ratio (with respect to the expected value for a particular lung area in a defined position) impairs pulmonary gas exchange and is a cause of low arterial partial pressure of oxygen (pO_{2}). Excretion of carbon dioxide is also impaired, but a rise in the arterial partial pressure of carbon dioxide (pCO_{2}) is very uncommon because this leads to respiratory stimulation and the resultant increase in alveolar ventilation returns paCO_{2} to within the normal range. These abnormal phenomena are usually seen in chronic bronchitis, asthma, hepatopulmonary syndrome, and acute pulmonary edema.
- A high V/Q ratio decreases pCO_{2} and increases pO_{2} in alveoli. Because of the increased dead space ventilation, the arterial pO_{2} is reduced and thus also the peripheral oxygen saturation is lower than normal, leading to tachypnea and dyspnea. This finding is typically associated with pulmonary embolism (where blood circulation is impaired by an embolus). Ventilation is wasted, as it fails to oxygenate any blood. A high V/Q can also be observed in emphysema as a maladaptive ventilatory overwork of the undamaged lung parenchyma. Because of the loss of alveolar surface area, there is proportionally more ventilation per available perfusion area. As a contrast, this loss of surface area leads to decreased arterial pO_{2} due to impaired gas exchange (see Fick's laws of diffusion).
