= Christian Bohr =

Danish physician (1855–1911)

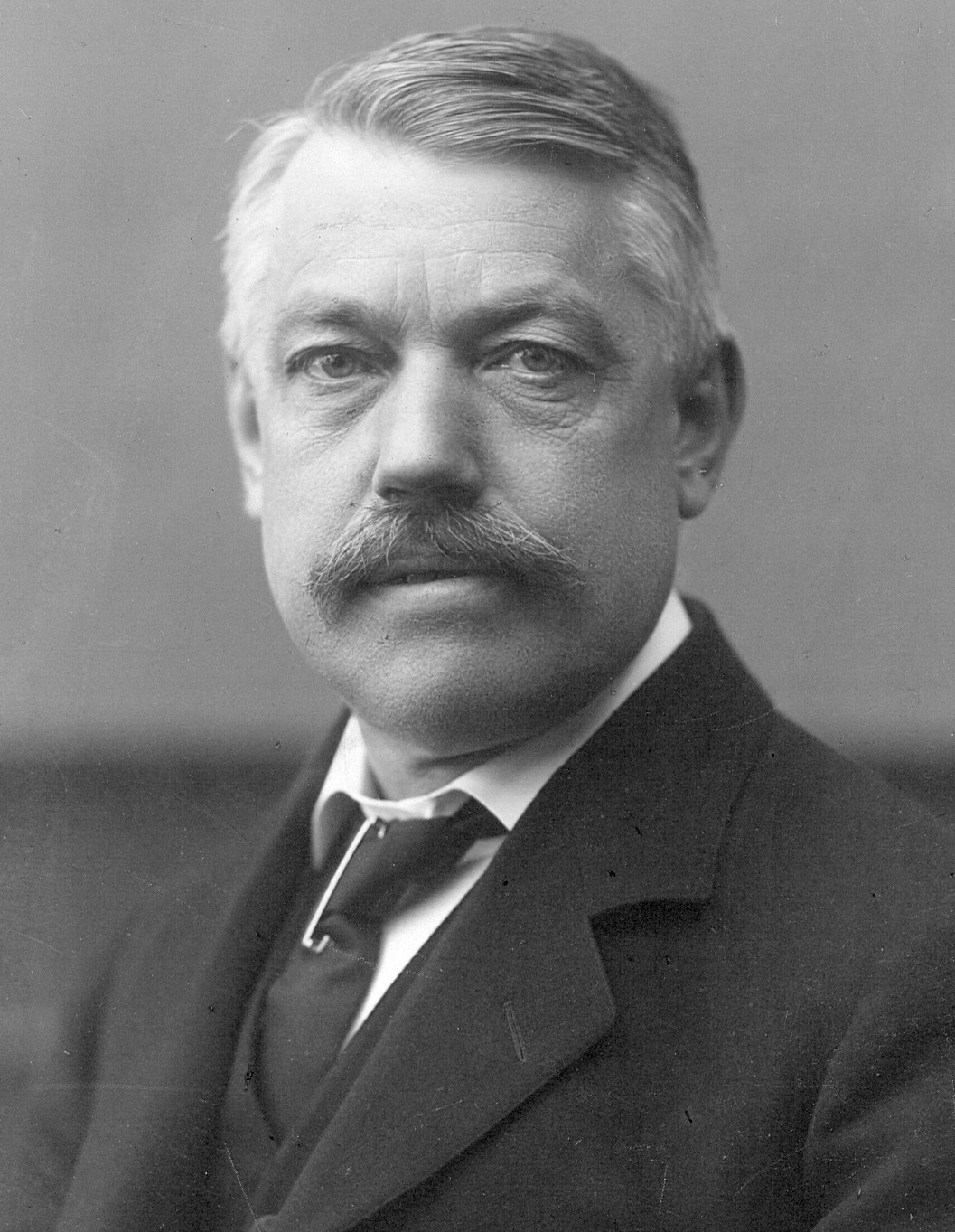
- Born: Christian Harald Lauritz Peter Emil Bohr; 14 February 1855; Copenhagen, Denmark
- Died: 3 February 1911 (aged 55); Copenhagen, Denmark
- Resting place: Assistens Cemetery, Copenhagen
- Education: Medical degree, Doctorate in physiology
- Occupation: Professor at University of Copenhagen
- Known for: Cooperative binding Dead space Diffusing capacity Bohr effect Bohr equation
- Spouse: Ellen Bohr (married 1881)
- Children: Jenny Bohr (1883–1933); Niels Bohr (1885–1962); Harald Bohr (1887–1951)
- Parents: Henrik Georg Christian Bohr; Caroline Agusta Lovise Rienestad

Christian Harald Lauritz Peter Emil Bohr (14 February 1855 – 3 February 1911) was a Danish physician, father of the physicist and Nobel laureate Niels Bohr, as well as the mathematician and football player Harald Bohr and grandfather of another physicist and Nobel laureate Aage Bohr. He married Ellen Adler in 1881.

== Personal life ==
He wrote his first scientific paper, "Om salicylsyrens indflydelse på kødfordøjelsen" ("On salicylic acid's influence on the digestion of meat"), at the age of 22. He received his medical degree in 1880, studied under Carl Ludwig at University of Leipzig, took a Ph.D. in physiology and was appointed professor of physiology at the University of Copenhagen in 1886.

Christian Bohr is buried in the Assistens Kirkegård.

== Physiology ==
In 1891, he was the first to characterize the physiological dead space in pulmonary respiration, i.e., the inhaled air volume not involved in gas exchange.

In 1904, Christian Bohr described the phenomenon, now called the Bohr effect, whereby hydrogen ions ( H^{+}) and carbon dioxide (CO_{2}) heterotopically decrease hemoglobin's oxygen-binding affinity. This regulation increases the efficiency of oxygen release by hemoglobin in tissues, like active muscle tissue, where rapid metabolization has produced relatively high concentrations of H^{+} and CO_{2}.

== Sources ==
- Fredericia, L.S. (1932). Christian Bohr, pp. 173–176. In: Meisen, V. (1932). Prominent Danish Scientists through the Ages. University Library of Copenhagen 450th Anniversary. Levin & Munksgaard, Copenhagen.
