= Hyperoxia test =

Test performed to determine the etiology of cyanosis

- Purpose: measures arterial blood gases

A hyperoxia test is a test that is performed—usually on an infant—to determine whether the patient's cyanosis is due to lung disease or a problem with blood circulation. It is performed by measuring the arterial blood gases of the patient while they breathe room air, then re-measuring the blood gases after the patient has breathed 100% oxygen for 10 minutes.^{:141}^{:141}

If the cause of the cyanosis is poor oxygen saturation by the lungs, allowing the patient to breathe 100% oxygen will augment the lungs' ability to saturate the blood with oxygen, and the partial pressure of oxygen in the arterial blood will rise (usually above 150 mmHg). However, if the lungs are healthy and already fully saturating the blood that is delivered to them, then supplemental oxygen will have no effect, and the partial pressure of oxygen will usually remain below 100 mmHg. In this case, the cyanosis is most likely due to blood that moves from the systemic veins to the systemic arteries via a right-to-left shunt without ever going through the lungs.^{:141}
