= Ventilation/perfusion scan =

Medical imaging to evaluate circulation of air and blood in the lungs

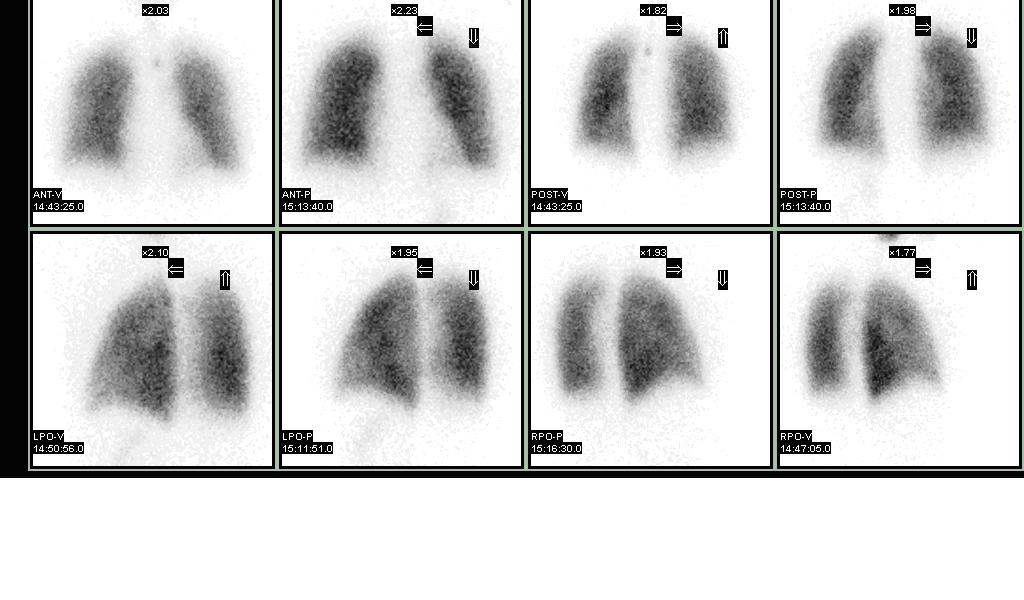
- Normal pulmonary ventilation and perfusion (V/Q) scan. The nuclear medicine V/Q scan is useful in the evaluation of pulmonary embolism.
- OPS-301 code: 3-703.2

A ventilation/perfusion lung scan, also called a V/Q lung scan, or ventilation/perfusion scintigraphy, is a type of medical imaging using scintigraphy and medical isotopes to evaluate the circulation of air and blood within a patient's lungs, in order to determine the ventilation/perfusion ratio. The ventilation part of the test looks at the ability of air to reach all parts of the lungs, while the perfusion part evaluates how well blood circulates within the lungs. In physiology, perfusion is described with the letter Q, hence the term V/Q scan.

== Uses ==
This test is most commonly done in order to check for the presence of a blood clot or abnormal blood flow inside the lungs (such as a pulmonary embolism (PE) although computed tomography with radiocontrast is now more commonly used for this purpose. The V/Q scan may be used in some circumstances where radiocontrast would be inappropriate, as in allergy to contrast agent or kidney failure.

A V/Q lung scan may be performed in the case of serious lung disorders such as chronic obstructive pulmonary disease (COPD) or pneumonia as well as a lung performance quantification tool pre- and post-lung lobectomy surgery.

=== Significance of results ===
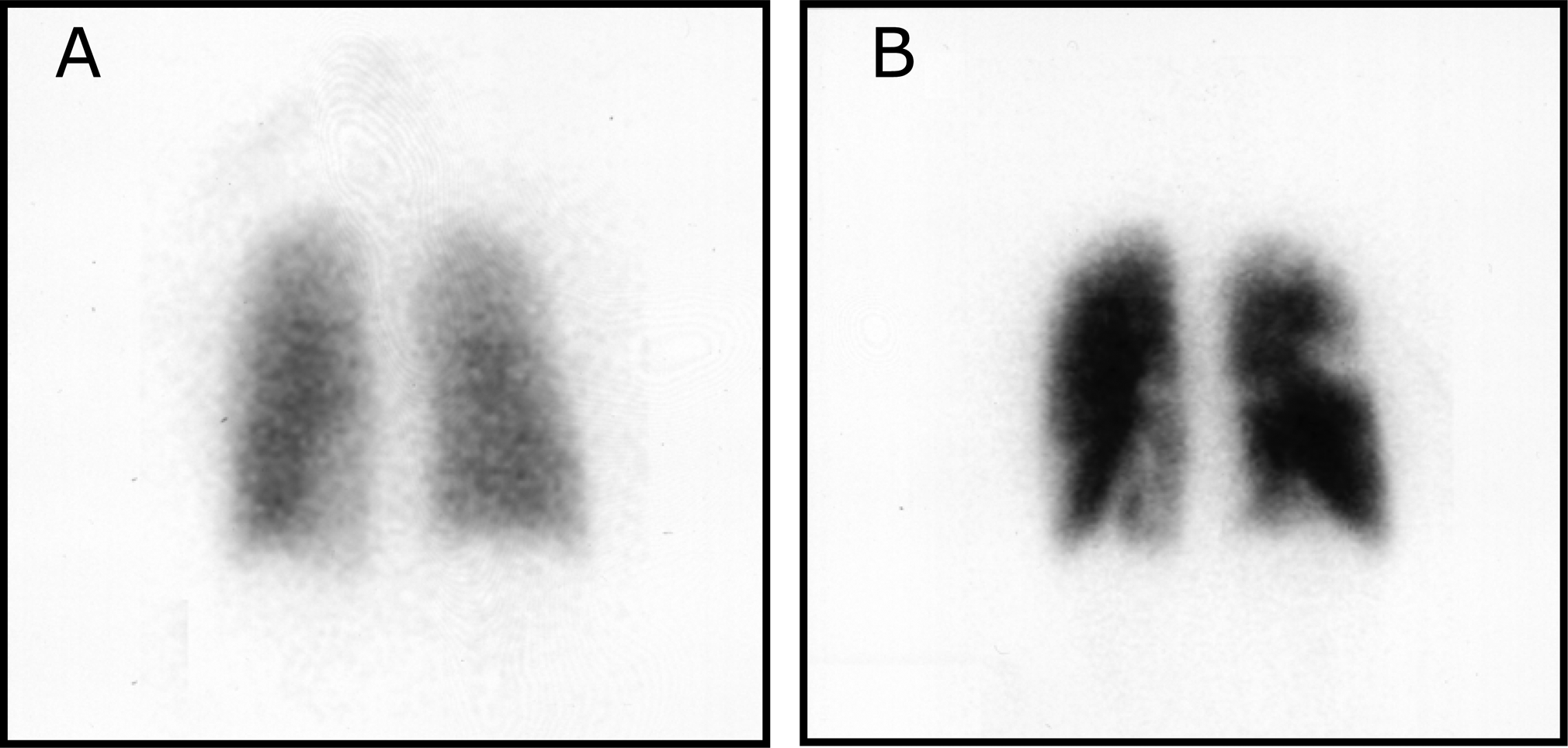
Ventilation-perfusion scintigraphy in a woman taking oral contraceptives and valdecoxib with a pulmonary embolism. (A) After inhalation of 20 mCi of Xenon-133 gas, scintigraphic images were obtained in the posterior projection, showing uniform ventilation to lungs.. (B) After intravenous injection of 4.1 mCi of Technetium-99m-labeled macroaggregated albumin, scintigraphic images were obtained, shown here in the posterior projection. This and other views showed decreased activity in the following regions: apical segment of right upper lobe, anterior segment of right upper lobe, superior segment of right lower lobe, posterior basal segment of right lower lobe, anteromedial basal segment of left lower lobe, and lateral basal segment of left lower lobe.

V/Q Scan Interpretation
| Result | Interpretation | Significance |
|---|---|---|
| Normal | No perfusion deficit | Excludes pulmonary thromboembolism |
| Low probability | Perfusion deficit with matched ventilation deficit | < 20% probability of PE |
| Intermediate probability | Perfusion deficit that corresponds to parenchymal abnormality on chest x-ray | 20% - 80% probability of PE |
| High probability | Multiple segmental perfusion deficits with normal ventilation | > 80% probability of PE |

Decreased uptake of the inhaled radioisotope may indicate an impaired ability to breathe, airway obstruction, or possible pneumonia.

Decreased circulation of the injected MAA indicates a problem with blood flow into or within the lungs. A localized area of decreased uptake, usually in a wedge shaped (or pie shaped) configuration with normal ventilation images (mismatched defect) suggests a pulmonary embolus or blood clot in the lungs, which leads to reduced perfusion beyond the obstruction.

== Risks ==
Although this test uses radioactive materials, the total amount of radiation exposure is low. Typical effective doses for a V/Q scan range from one to five mSv. In order to decrease the radiation exposure in pregnant patients, the total radioactivity administered may be decreased or the ventilation phase omitted. A CT pulmonary angiogram (CTPA) with radiocontrast can alternatively be performed, although this can result in a greater radiation dose to the patient.

== Procedure ==
The ventilation and perfusion phases of a V/Q lung scan are performed together and may include a chest X-ray for comparison or to look for other causes of lung disease. A defect in the perfusion images requires a mismatched ventilation defect to indicate pulmonary embolism.

In the ventilation phase of the test, a gaseous radionuclides such as xenon-133, krypton-81m, or technetium-99m DTPA in an aerosol form is inhaled by the patient through a mouthpiece or mask that covers the nose and mouth. Ventilation imaging can also be performed using a Technegas machine which produces an aerosol of radioactive nanoparticles, specifically carbon nanoparticles containing technetium-99m. The perfusion phase of the test involves the intravenous injection of radioactive technetium macro aggregated albumin (Tc99m-MAA). A gamma camera acquires the images for both phases of the study. A SPECT image can also be taken following an injection of technetium labelled MAA. SPECT is often skipped if the patient has pulmonary hypertension.

It is also possible to perform the scan with positron emission tomography (PET) rather than conventional gamma camera scintigraphy. This has been performed with gallium-68 labelled carbon nanoparticles (Galligas) using a conventional Technegas machine for ventilation images, and with gallium-68 labelled MAA (Ga68-MAA) for perfusion images. PET has multiple potential advantages including superior resolution, speed and quantification.

== See also ==
- Ventilation/perfusion ratio
