= Pulmonary-to-systemic shunt =

Cardiac shunt

- Specialty: Vascular medicine

A pulmonary-to-systemic shunt is a cardiac shunt which allows, or is designed to cause, blood to flow from the pulmonary circulation to the systemic circulation. This occurs when:

1. there is a passage between two or more of the great vessels; and,
2. pulmonic pressure is higher than systemic pressure and/or the shunt has a one-way valvular opening.

A pulmonary-to-systemic shunt functions as follows:

1. right-to-left in the absence of arterioventricular discordance.
2. left-to-right if the great vessels are transposed.
