= Cellular waste product =

Cellular waste products are formed as a by-product of cellular respiration, a series of processes and reactions that generate energy for the cell, in the form of ATP. One example of cellular respiration creating cellular waste products are aerobic respiration and anaerobic respiration.

Each pathway generates different waste products.

== Aerobic respiration ==
When in the presence of oxygen, cells use aerobic respiration to obtain energy from glucose molecules.

Simplified Theoretical Reaction: C_{6}H_{12}O_{6 (aq)} + 6O_{2 (g)} → 6CO_{2 (g)} + 6H_{2}O_{(l)} + ~ 30ATP

Cells undergoing aerobic respiration produce 6 molecules of carbon dioxide, 6 molecules of water, and up to 30 molecules of ATP (adenosine triphosphate), which is directly used to produce energy, from each molecule of glucose in the presence of surplus oxygen.

In aerobic respiration, oxygen serves as the recipient of electrons from the electron transport chain. Aerobic respiration is thus very efficient because oxygen is a strong oxidant. Aerobic respiration proceeds in a series of steps, which also increases efficiency - since glucose is broken down gradually and ATP is produced as needed, less energy is wasted as heat. This strategy results in the waste products H_{2}O and CO_{2} being formed in different amounts at different phases of respiration. CO_{2} is formed in Pyruvate decarboxylation, H_{2}O is formed in oxidative phosphorylation, and both are formed in the citric acid cycle. The simple nature of the final products also indicates the efficiency of this method of respiration. All of the energy stored in the carbon-carbon bonds of glucose is released, leaving CO_{2} and H_{2}O. Although there is energy stored in the bonds of these molecules, this energy is not easily accessible by the cell. All usable energy is efficiently extracted.

== Anaerobic respiration ==
Anaerobic respiration is done by aerobic organisms when there is not sufficient oxygen in a cell to undergo aerobic respiration as well as by cells called anaerobes that selectively perform anaerobic respiration even in the presence of oxygen. In anaerobic respiration, weak oxidants like sulfate and nitrate serve as oxidants in the place of oxygen.

Generally, in anaerobic respiration sugars are broken down into carbon dioxide and other waste products that are dictated by the oxidant the cell uses. Whereas in aerobic respiration the oxidant is always oxygen, in anaerobic respiration it varies. Each oxidant produces a different waste product, such as nitrite, succinate, sulfide, methane, and acetate. Anaerobic respiration is correspondingly less efficient than aerobic respiration. In the absence of oxygen, not all of the carbon-carbon bonds in glucose can be broken to release energy. A great deal of extractable energy is left in the waste products. Anaerobic respiration generally occurs in prokaryotes in environments that do not contain oxygen.

== Fermentation ==
Fermentation is another process by which cells can extract energy from glucose. It is not a form of cellular respiration, but it does generate ATP, break down glucose, and produce waste products. Fermentation, like aerobic respiration, begins by breaking glucose into two pyruvate molecules. From here, it proceeds using endogenous organic electron receptors, whereas cellular respiration uses exogenous receptors, such as oxygen in aerobic respiration and nitrate in anaerobic respiration. These varied organic receptors each generate different waste products. Common products are lactic acid, lactose, hydrogen, and ethanol. Carbon dioxide is also commonly produced. Fermentation occurs primarily in anaerobic conditions, although some organisms such as yeast use fermentation even when oxygen is plentiful.

=== Lactic Acid Fermentation ===
Simplified Theoretical Reaction: C_{6}H_{12}O_{6} $\to$ 2C_{3}H_{6}O_{3} + 2 ATP (120 kJ) Lactic Acid Fermentation is commonly known as the process by which mammalian muscle cells produce energy in anaerobic environments, as in instances of great physical exertion, and is the simplest type of fermentation. It starts along the same pathway as aerobic respiration, but once glucose is converted to pyruvate proceeds down one of two pathways and produces only two molecules of ATP from each molecule of glucose. In the homolactic pathway, it produces lactic acid as waste. In the heterolactic pathway, it produces lactic acid as well as ethanol and carbon dioxide. Lactic acid fermentation is relatively inefficient. The waste products lactic acid and ethanol have not been fully oxidized and still contain energy, but it requires the addition of oxygen to extract this energy.

Generally, lactic acid fermentation occurs only when aerobic cells are lacking oxygen. However, some aerobic mammalian cells will preferentially use lactic acid fermentation over aerobic respiration. This phenomenon is called the Warburg effect and is found primarily in cancer cells. Muscles cells under great exertion will also use lactic acid fermentation to supplement aerobic respiration. Lactic acid fermentation is somewhat faster, although less efficient, than aerobic respiration, so in activities like sprinting it can help quickly provide needed energy to muscles.

== Secretion and effects of waste products ==
Cellular respiration takes place in the cristae of the mitochondria within cells. Depending on the pathways followed, the products are dealt with in different ways.

CO_{2} is excreted from the cell via diffusion into the blood stream, where it is transported in three ways:

- Up to 7% is dissolved in its molecular form in blood plasma.
- About 70-80% is converted into hydrocarbonate ions,
- The remainder binds with haemoglobin in red blood cells, is carried to the lungs, and exhaled.

H_{2}O also diffuses out of the cell into the bloodstream, from where it is excreted in the form of perspiration, water vapour in the breath, or urine from the kidneys. Water, along with some dissolved solutes, are removed from blood circulation in the nephrons of the kidney and eventually excreted as urine.

The products of fermentation can be processed in different ways, depending on the cellular conditions.

Lactic acid tends to accumulate in the muscles, which causes pain in the muscle and joint as well as fatigue. It also creates a gradient which induces water to flow out of cells and increases blood pressure. Research suggests that lactic acid may also play a role in lowering levels of potassium in the blood. It can also be converted back to pyruvate or converted back to glucose in the liver and fully metabolized by aerobic respiration.

== See also ==
- Aerobic respiration
- Lactic acid fermentation
