= Technetium (99mTc) albumin aggregated =

Injectable radiopharmaceutical

Technetium (^{99m}Tc) albumin aggregated
Clinical data
- Trade names: Pulmotech MAA
- Other names: MP-4006
- AHFS/Drugs.com: Micromedex Detailed Consumer Information
- License data: US DailyMed: Technetium_Tc_99m_albumin
- Routes of administration: Intravenous
- ATC code: V09GA04 (WHO)

Legal status
- Legal status: AU: Unscheduled; US: ℞-only

Identifiers
- DrugBank: DB14230
- ChemSpider: none
- UNII: 799C8VF17R
- KEGG: D06023

Technetium ^{99m}Tc albumin aggregated (^{99m}Tc-MAA) is an injectable radiopharmaceutical used in nuclear medicine. It consists of a sterile aqueous suspension of Technetium-99m (^{99m}Tc) labeled to human albumin aggregate particles. It is commonly used for lung perfusion scanning. It is also less commonly used to visualise a peritoneovenous shunt and for isotope venography.

== Preparation ==
DraxImage MAA kits for preparing ^{99m}Tc-MAA are available in the United States from only a single manufacturer; Jubilant DraxImage Inc. The kits are delivered to nuclear pharmacies as lyophilized powders of non-radioactive ingredients sealed under nitrogen. A nuclear pharmacist adds anywhere from 50 - 100 mCi of Na[^{99m}TcO_{4}] to the reaction vial to make the final product, in the pH range of 3.8 to 8.0. After being allowed to react at room temperature for 15 minutes to ensure maximum labeling of the human albumin with ^{99m}Tc, the kit can then be diluted with sterile normal saline as needed.

Once prepared the product will have a turbid white appearance.

=== Quality control ===
No less than 90% of MAA particles can be between 10 - 90 micrometres in size and no particles may exceed 150 micrometres due to the risk of pulmonary artery blockade. No less than 90% of the radioactivity present in the product must be tagged to albumin particles. Thus, no more than 10% soluble impurities may be present.

== Dosage and imaging ==
The typical adult dose for a lung imaging study is 40-150 Megabecquerels (1-4 mCi) (containing between 100,000 - 200,000 albumin particles). The particle burden should be lowered for most pediatric patients and lowered to 50,000 for infants. The use of more than 250,000 particles in a dose is controversial as little extra data is acquired from such scans while there is an increased risk of toxicity. Patients with pulmonary hypertension should be administered a minimum number of particles to achieve a lung scan (i.e. 60,000). In any patient by administering a greater quantity of particles than necessary for the diagnostic procedure increases the risks of toxicity.

Because of gravity effects, people administered ^{99m}Tc MAA should be in the supine position to ensure as even a distribution of particles throughout the lungs as possible.

The total percentage of particles trapped in the lungs can be determined through a whole body scan after the administration of ^{99m}Tc MAA through the equation:

$$\%\ \text{Right-to-left shunt} = \left(\frac{(\text{Total body counts}) - (\text{Total lung counts})}{(\text{Total body counts})}\right)\times 100\%$$.

== History ==
The technetium tc 99m aggregated albumin kit was approved for use in the United States in December 1987.
