= Ventilation–perfusion mismatch =

Cardiorespiratory condition

In the respiratory system, ventilation/perfusion (V/Q) mismatch refers to the pathological discrepancy between ventilation (V) and perfusion (Q) resulting in an abnormal ventilation/perfusion (V/Q) ratio. Ventilation is a measure of the amount of inhaled air that reaches the alveoli, while perfusion is a measure of the amount of deoxygenated blood that reaches the alveoli through the capillary beds. Under normal conditions, ventilation-perfusion coupling keeps ventilation (V) at approximately 4 L/min and normal perfusion (Q) at approximately 5 L/min. Thus, at rest, a normal V/Q ratio is 0.8. Any deviation from this value is considered a V/Q mismatch. Maintenance of the V/Q ratio is crucial for preservation of effective pulmonary gas exchange and maintenance of oxygenation levels. A mismatch can contribute to hypoxemia and often signifies the presence or worsening of an underlying pulmonary condition.

== Examples ==
In a condition such as pulmonary embolism, the pulmonary blood flow is affected, thus the ventilation of the lung is adequate, however there is a perfusion defect. Gas exchange thus becomes highly inefficient leading to hypoxemia, as measured by arterial oxygenation. A ventilation perfusion scan or lung scintigraphy can be used to diagnose areas of lungs being ventilated but not adequately perfused. This results in a raised Alveolar-arterial (A-a) gradient which is responsive to supplemental oxygen.

In conditions with right to left shunts, there are also ventilation perfusion defects with high A-a gradients. Hypoxemia is difficult to correct with supplemental oxygen and is associated with a widened A-a gradient. In cases of right to left shunts more of deoxygenated blood mixes with oxygenated blood from the lungs and thus to a small extent the condition might neutralize the high A-a gradient with pure oxygen therapy. Patient with parenchymal lung diseases will have an increased A-a gradient with moderate response to oxygen therapy.

A patient with hypoventilation will have complete response to 100% oxygen therapy.

== Diagnosis ==
To differentiate between a ventilation perfusion mismatch or not, a lung scan is performed. The ventilation and perfusion are measured separately. If both scans are done simultaneously then it is called as V/Q scan. Ventilation Scan is done first as it is easy to wash out tracer gas from lungs with the help of hyperventilation than clearing the tracer radioactive material from blood.

Indication: It is most commonly done in suspected case of pulmonary embolism..

1. Ventilation Scan: Takes 15 to 20 minutes. A radioactive tracer gas is inhaled and then this radioactive tracer gas is traced (looked) by taking pictures from specialised camera which capture the route and location of tracer gas. These pictures show us the part of lung devoid of tracer gas and then we correlate it with different types of lung pathology.
  - By using a mouth piece while closing nose with the help of clip, person is asked to inhale the radioactive tracer gas for few minutes and pictures are taken at regular intervals.
  - Then person is asked to hold the breath and remain still for at least 10 seconds and final picture is taken.
  - Then by looking upon the picture, the poorly ventilated or overvented area is noted.
2. Perfusion scan: It is done by injecting a radioactive tracer into a peripheral vein usually in arms and then following the path of tracer by camera as the tracer moves to lungs. It tells us about the area of lung poorly perfused or any type of obstruction to the flow like in case of pulmonary embolism which will be seen on image as an area devoid of tracer element distal to the obstruction.

Results:

1. Ventilation Scan is abnormal but perfusion scan is normal indicating abnormal airway suggesting COPD or asthma.
2. Ventilation Scan is normal but perfusion is abnormal indicating any obstruction to the blood flow (perfusion), may be because of the pulmonary embolism obstructing the flow.
3. Both scans are abnormal. It may be found in pneumonia or COPD.

Results are reported in following way:

1. Normal - No abnormality found.
2. Low Probability - Chances of blood clot is low. Needs further and more testing.
3. Intermediate Probability - Scan shows possibility of blood clot. Needs more testing.
4. High Probability - High chances of clot. Needs treatment.

== Management ==
Through ventilation and perfusion scans, the abnormal area of lung may be localized. A provisional diagnosis of COPD, asthma or pulmonary embolisms may be made. Treatment of these underlying conditions may address ventilation perfusion mismatch.

Management of the condition may vary. If ventilation is abnormal or low, increasing the tidal volume or the rate may result in the poorly ventilated area receiving an adequate amount of air, which ultimately leads to an improved V/Q ratio. Conversely, if perfusion scan is of low quality showing low perfusion to lung as in case of hypovolemia, treatment of the conditions is by giving it fluid and using inotropes in case of shock.
