= Right-to-left shunt =

Cardiac shunt allowing blood to flow from the right heart to the left heart

A right-to-left shunt is a cardiac shunt which allows blood to flow from the right heart to the left heart. This terminology is used both for the abnormal state in humans and for normal physiological shunts in reptiles.

== Clinical Significance ==
A right-to-left shunt occurs when:

1. there is an opening or passage between the atria, ventricles, and/or great vessels; and,
2. right heart pressure is higher than left heart pressure and/or the shunt has a one-way valvular opening.

Small physiological, or "normal", shunts are seen due to the return of bronchial artery blood and coronary blood through the Thebesian veins, which are deoxygenated, to the left side of the heart.

=== Causes ===
Congenital defects can lead to right-to-left shunting immediately after birth:

- Persistent truncus arteriosus (minimal cyanosis)
- Transposition of great vessels
- Tricuspid atresia
- Tetralogy of Fallot
- Total anomalous pulmonary venous return

A mnemonic to remember the conditions associated with right-to-left shunting involves the numbers 1-5, as follows:

- 1 Combination Vessel: Persistent truncus arteriosus (minimal cyanosis)
- 2 Vessels involved: Transposition of great vessels
- 3 Leaflets: Tricuspid atresia
- 4 Tetra- prefix: Tetralogy of Fallot
- 5 Words: Total anomalous pulmonary venous return

A mainstem intubation with an endotracheal tube can lead to right-to-left shunting. This occurs when the tip of the endotracheal tube is placed beyond the carina. In this way only one lung is oxygenated and oxygen-poor blood from the non-ventilated lung dilutes the oxygen level of blood returning from the lungs in the left ventricle.

==== Eisenmenger syndrome ====
An uncorrected left-to-right shunt can progress to a right-to-left shunt; this process is termed Eisenmenger syndrome. This is seen in Ventricular septal defect, Atrial septal defect, and patent ductus arteriosus, and can manifest as late as adult life. This switch in blood flow direction is precipitated by pulmonary hypertension due to increased pulmonary blood flow in a left-to-right shunt. The right ventricle hypertrophies to compensate for this pulmonary hypertension, so the right ventricular pressure becomes higher than the pressure in the left ventricle. Because of this switch in the pressure gradient, blood starts flowing right to left, forming a right-to-left shunt. As with any right-to-left shunt, there is decreased blood flow to the lungs, resulting in decreased oxygenation of blood and cyanosis.

==== Tetralogy of Fallot ====
The most common cause of right-to-left shunt is the Tetralogy of Fallot, a congenital cardiac anomaly characterized by four co-existing heart defects.

1. Pulmonary stenosis (narrowing of the pulmonary valve and outflow tract, obstructing blood flow from the right ventricle to the pulmonary artery)
2. Overriding aorta (aortic valve is enlarged and appears to arise from both the left and right ventricles instead of the left ventricle, as occurs in normal hearts)
3. Right ventricular hypertrophy (thickening of the muscular walls of the right ventricle, this is a result of the increased amount of work the heart has to do)
4. Ventricular septal defect (a hole exists in the septum that divides the left and right ventricles)

Outside of heart-related conditions, right-to-left shunts of the heart can be seen with Pulmonary Arteriovenous Malformations (PAVMs).

=== Symptoms ===
Early cyanosis is a symptom of a right-to-left shunt. A right-to-left shunt results in decreased blood flow through the pulmonary system, leading to decreased blood oxygen levels (hypoxemia). Hypoxemia manifests as cyanosis, causing "blue babies."

=== Diagnosis ===
Differentiation between a right-to-left shunt and pulmonary disease is often aided clinically by the results of a hyperoxia test. Using high levels of inspired oxygen should have little effect on the dissolved O2 in the blood because highly oxygenated blood is diluted by shunted (low oxygenation) blood.

=== Shunt equation ===
$Q_p/Q_s = (CcO_2 - CaO_2)/(CcO_2 - CvO_2)$

- Q_{p}/Q_{s} is the shunt fraction
- CcO_{2} is the end-capillary oxygen content
- CaO_{2} is the arterial oxygen content
- CvO_{2} is the mixed venous oxygen content.

== Reptiles ==
Because most reptiles have a single ventricle and all reptiles have both a right aortic arch and a left aortic arch, all reptiles have the capacity for right-to-left shunt.
