= Dead space (physiology) =

Inhaled air volume not involved in gas exchange

Blood gas, acid-base, and gas exchange terms
- P_{a}O_{2}: Arterial oxygen tension, or partial pressure
- P_{A}O_{2}: Alveolar oxygen tension, or partial pressure
- P_{a}CO_{2}: Arterial carbon dioxide tension, or partial pressure
- P_{A}CO_{2}: Alveolar carbon dioxide tension, or partial pressure
- P_{v}O_{2}: Oxygen tension of mixed venous blood
- P_{(A-a)}O_{2}: Alveolar-arterial oxygen tension difference. The term formerly used (A-a DO_{2}) is discouraged.
- P_{(a/A)}O_{2}: Alveolar-arterial tension ratio; P_{a}O_{2}:P_{A}O_{2} The term oxygen exchange index describes this ratio.
- C_{(a-v)}O_{2}: Arteriovenous oxygen content difference
- S_{a}O_{2}: Oxygen saturation of the hemoglobin of arterial blood
- S_{p}O_{2}: Oxygen saturation as measured by pulse oximetry
- C_{a}O_{2}: Oxygen content of arterial blood
- pH: Symbol relating the hydrogen ion concentration or activity of a solution to that of a standard solution; approximately equal to the negative logarithm of the hydrogen ion concentration. pH is an indicator of the relative acidity or alkalinity of a solution

Dead space is the volume of air that is inhaled that does not take part in the gas exchange, because it either remains in the conducting airways or reaches alveoli that are not perfused or poorly perfused. It means that not all the air in each breath is available for the exchange of oxygen and carbon dioxide. Mammals breathe in and out of their lungs, and waste that part of the inhaled air which remains in the conducting airways where no gas exchange can occur.

== Components ==
Total dead space (also known as physiological dead space) is the sum of the anatomical dead space and the alveolar dead space.

Benefits do accrue to a seemingly wasteful design for ventilation that includes dead space.

1. Carbon dioxide is retained, making a bicarbonate-buffered blood and interstitium possible.
2. Inspired air is brought to body temperature, increasing the affinity of hemoglobin for oxygen, improving O_{2} uptake.
3. Particulate matter is trapped on the mucus that lines the conducting airways, allowing its removal by mucociliary transport.
4. Inspired air is humidified, improving the quality of airway mucus.

In humans, about a third of every resting breath has no change in O_{2} and CO_{2} levels. In adults, it is usually in the range of 150 mL.

Dead space can be increased (and better envisioned) by breathing through a long tube, such as a snorkel. Although one end of the snorkel is open to the air, when the wearer breathes in, they inhale a significant quantity of air that remained in the snorkel from the previous exhalation. Therefore, a snorkel increases the person's dead space by adding even more airway that does not participate in gas exchange.

=== Anatomical dead space ===
Anatomical dead space is the volume of the conducting airways (from the nose, mouth and trachea to the terminal bronchioles). These conduct gas to the alveoli but no gas exchange occurs here. In healthy lungs where the alveolar dead space is small, Fowler's method accurately measures the anatomic dead space using a single breath nitrogen washout technique.

The normal value for dead space volume (in mL) is approximately the lean mass of the body (in pounds), and averages about a third of the resting tidal volume (450-500 mL). In Fowler's original study, the anatomic dead space was 156 ± 28 mL (n=45 males) or 26% of their tidal volume. Despite the flexibility of the trachea and smaller conducting airways, their overall volume (i.e. the anatomic dead space) changes little with bronchoconstriction or when breathing hard during exercise.

As birds have a longer and wider trachea than mammals the same size, they have a disproportionately large anatomic dead space, reducing the airway resistance. This adaptation does not impact gas exchange because birds flow air through their lungs - they do not breathe in and out like mammals.

=== Alveolar dead space ===
Alveolar dead space is defined as the difference between the physiologic dead space and the anatomic dead space. It is contributed to by all the terminal respiratory units that are over-ventilated relative to their perfusion. Therefore it includes, firstly those units that are ventilated but not perfused, and secondly those units which have a ventilation-perfusion ratio greater than one.

Alveolar dead space is negligible in healthy individuals, but it can increase dramatically in some lung diseases due to ventilation-perfusion mismatch.

== Calculating ==
Just as dead space wastes a fraction of the inhaled breath, dead space dilutes alveolar air during exhalation. By quantifying this dilution, it is possible to measure physiological dead space, employing the concept of mass balance, as expressed by the Bohr equation.

$$\frac{V_{d}}{V_{t}} = \frac {P_{a\,\ce{CO2}} - P_{e\,\ce{CO2}}} {P_{a\,\ce{CO2}}}$$

where $V_{d}$ is the dead space volume and $V_{t}$ is the tidal volume;

$P_{a\,\ce{CO2}}$ is the partial pressure of carbon dioxide in the arterial blood, and
$P_{e\,\ce{CO2}}$ is the partial pressure of carbon dioxide in the mixed expired (exhaled) air.

=== Physiological dead space ===
The Bohr equation is used to measure physiological dead space. Unfortunately, the concentration of carbon dioxide (CO_{2}) in alveoli is required to use the equation but this is not a single value as the ventilation-perfusion ratio is different in different lung units both in health and in disease. In practice, the arterial partial pressure of CO_{2} is used as an estimate of the average alveolar partial pressure of CO_{2}, a modification introduced by Henrik Enghoff in 1938 (Enghoff H. Volumen inefficax. Bemerkungen zur Frage des schadlichen Raumes. Upsala Läkarefören Forhandl., 44:191-218, 1938). In effect, the single arterial pCO_{2} value averages out the different pCO_{2} values in the different alveoli, and so makes the Bohr equation useable.

The quantity of CO_{2} exhaled from the healthy alveoli is diluted by the air in the conducting airways (anatomic dead space) and by gas from alveoli that are over-ventilated in relation to their perfusion. This dilution factor can be calculated once the mixed expired pCO_{2} in the exhaled breath is determined (either by electronically monitoring the exhaled breath or by collecting the exhaled breath in a gas impermeant bag (a Douglas bag) and then measuring the pCO_{2} of the mixed expired gas in the collection bag). Algebraically, this dilution factor will give us the physiological dead space as calculated by the Bohr equation:

$$\frac{V_\ce{physiological\,dead\,space}}{V_t} = \frac {P_{a\,\ce{CO2}} - P_\ce{mixed\,expired\,CO2}} {P_{a\,\ce{CO2}}}$$

=== Alveolar dead space ===
The alveolar dead space is determined as the difference between the physiological dead space (measured using the Enghoff modification of the Bohr equation) and the anatomic dead space (measured using Fowler's single breath technique).

A clinical index of the size of the alveolar dead space is the difference between the arterial partial pressure of CO_{2} and the end-tidal partial pressure of CO_{2}.

=== Anatomic dead space ===
A different maneuver is employed in measuring anatomic dead space: the test subject breathes all the way out, inhales deeply from a 0% nitrogen gas mixture (usually 100% oxygen) and then breathes out into equipment that measures nitrogen and gas volume. This final exhalation occurs in three phases. The first phase (phase 1) has no nitrogen as that is gas that is 100% oxygen in the anatomic dead space. The nitrogen concentration then rapidly increases during the brief second phase (phase 2) and finally reaches a plateau in the third phase (phase 3). The anatomic dead space is equal to the volume exhaled during the first phase plus the volume up to the mid-point of the transition from phase 1 to phase 3.

== Ventilated patient ==
The depth and frequency of our breathing is determined by chemoreceptors and the brainstem, as modified by a number of subjective sensations. When mechanically ventilated using a mandatory mode, the patient breathes at a rate and tidal volume that is dictated by the machine. Because of dead space, taking deep breaths more slowly (e.g. ten 500 ml breaths per minute) is more effective than taking shallow breaths quickly (e.g. twenty 250 ml breaths per minute). Although the amount of gas per minute is the same (5 L/min), a large proportion of the shallow breaths is dead space, which does not help oxygen to get into the blood.

== Mechanical dead space ==
Mechanical dead space or external dead space is volume in the passages of a breathing apparatus in which the breathing gas flows in both directions as the user breathes in and out, causing the last exhaled gas to be immediately inhaled on the next breath, increasing the necessary tidal volume and respiratory effort to get the same amount of usable air or breathing gas, and increasing the accumulation of carbon dioxide from shallow breaths. It is in effect an external extension of the physiological dead space.

It can be reduced by:

- Using separate intake and exhaust passages with one-way valves placed in each passage, usually between each passage and the mouthpiece. This limits the dead space to between the non return valves and the user's mouth or nose. Not all of the volume between the non-return valves is necessarily dead space, as exhaled gas in narrow ducting will not necessarily mix well with fresh gas from inhalation ducting, but exhaled gas beyond the exhaust non-return valves can reasonably be assumed to not mix with fresh gas if the valves function correctly. The total effective dead space can be minimized by keeping the volume of this external dead space as small as possible, but this should not unduly increase the work of breathing, which can become critical in breathing apparatus used at high ambient pressure.
- With a full face mask or demand diving helmet:
  - Keeping the inside volume small
  - Having a small internal orinasal mask inside the main mask or helmet, which separates the external respiratory passage from the rest of the mask interior.
  - In a few models of full face mask a mouthpiece like those used on diving regulators is fitted, which has the same function as an orinasal mask, but can further reduce the volume of the external dead space, at the cost of forcing mouth-breathing (and acting like a gag, preventing clear talking).

=== Effects ===
Dead space reduces the amount of fresh breathing gas which reaches the alveoli during each breath. This reduces the oxygen available for gas exchange, and the amount of carbon dioxide that can be removed. The buildup of carbon dioxide is usually the more noticeable effect unless the breathing gas is hypoxic as occurs at high altitude. The body can compensate to some extent by increasing the volume of inspired gas, but this also increases work of breathing, and is only effective when the ratio of dead space to tidal volume is reduced sufficiently to compensate for the additional carbon dioxide load due to the increased work of breathing. Continued buildup of carbon dioxide will lead to hypercapnia and respiratory distress.

== Changes with exercise ==
In healthy people, V_{d} is about one-third of V_{t} at rest and decreases with exercise to about one-fifth mainly due to an increase in V_{t}, as anatomic dead space does not change much and alveolar dead space should be negligible or very small.

External dead space for a given breathing apparatus is usually fixed, and this volume must be added to tidal volume to provide equivalent effective ventilation at any given level of exertion.

== See also ==
- Bohr equation – Equation describing the amount of physiological dead space in a person's lungs
- Christian Bohr – Danish physician and professor of physiology
- Multiple inert gas elimination technique – Medical technique
- Respiratory system – Biological system in animals and plants for gas exchange
