= Hypoxemia =

Abnormally low level of oxygen in the blood

- Other names: Hypoxaemia
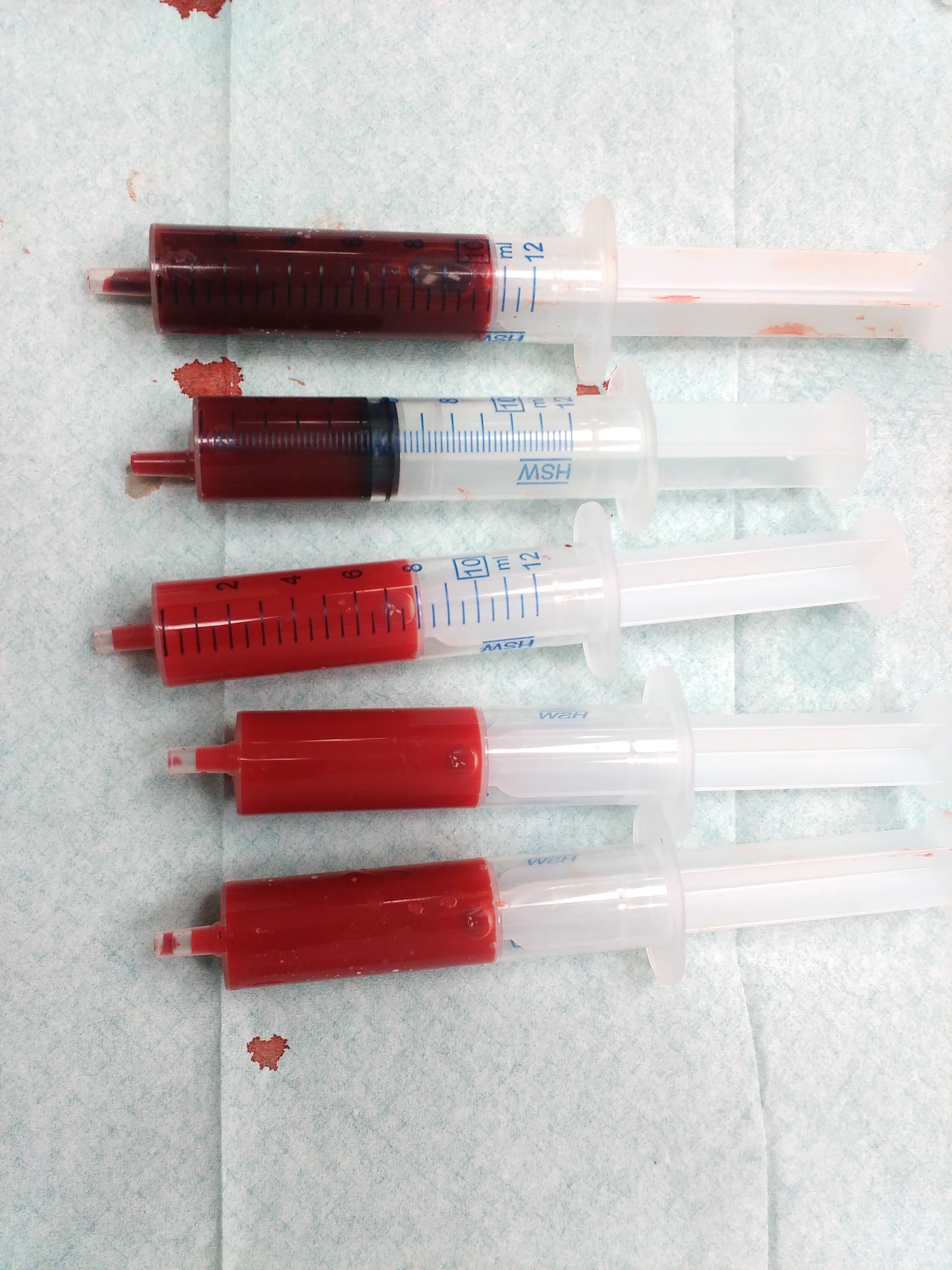
- Blood with higher oxygen content appears bright red
- Specialty: Pulmonology

Hypoxemia (also spelled hypoxaemia) is an abnormally low level of oxygen in the blood. More specifically, it is oxygen deficiency in arterial blood. Hypoxemia is usually caused by pulmonary disease. Sometimes the concentration of oxygen in the air is decreased leading to hypoxemia.

== Definition ==
Hypoxemia refers to the low level of oxygen in arterial blood. Tissue hypoxia refers to low levels of oxygen in the tissues of the body and the term hypoxia is a general term for low levels of oxygen. Hypoxemia is usually caused by pulmonary disease whereas tissue oxygenation requires additionally adequate circulation of blood and perfusion of tissue to meet metabolic demands.

Hypoxemia is usually defined in terms of reduced partial pressure of oxygen (mm Hg) in arterial blood, but also in terms of reduced content of oxygen (ml oxygen per dl blood) or percentage saturation of hemoglobin (the oxygen-binding protein within red blood cells) with oxygen, which is either found singly or in combination.

While there is general agreement that an arterial blood gas measurement which shows that the partial pressure of oxygen is lower than normal constitutes hypoxemia, there is less agreement concerning whether the oxygen content of blood is relevant in determining hypoxemia. This definition would include oxygen carried by hemoglobin. The oxygen content of blood is thus sometimes viewed as a measure of tissue delivery rather than hypoxemia.

== Signs and symptoms ==
In an acute context, hypoxemia can cause symptoms such as those in respiratory distress. These include breathlessness, an increased rate of breathing, use of the chest and abdominal muscles to breathe, and lip pursing.

Chronic hypoxemia may be compensated or uncompensated. The compensation may cause symptoms to be overlooked initially, however, further disease or a stress such as any increase in oxygen demand may finally unmask the existing hypoxemia. In a compensated state, blood vessels supplying less-ventilated areas of the lung may selectively contract, to redirect the blood to areas of the lungs which are better ventilated. However, in a chronic context, and if the lungs are not well ventilated generally, this mechanism can result in pulmonary hypertension, overloading the right ventricle of the heart and causing cor pulmonale and right sided heart failure. Polycythemia can also occur. In children, chronic hypoxemia may manifest as delayed growth, neurological development and motor development and decreased sleep quality with frequent sleep arousals.

Other symptoms of hypoxemia may include cyanosis, digital clubbing, and symptoms that may relate to the cause of the hypoxemia, including cough and hemoptysis.

Serious hypoxemia typically occurs when the partial pressure of oxygen in blood is less than 60 mmHg (8.0 kPa), the beginning of the steep portion of the oxygen–hemoglobin dissociation curve, where a small decrease in the partial pressure of oxygen results in a large decrease in the oxygen content of the blood. Severe hypoxia can lead to respiratory failure.

== Causes ==
Hypoxemia refers to insufficient oxygen in the blood. Thus any cause that influences the rate or volume of air entering the lungs (ventilation) or any cause that influences the transfer of air from the lungs to the blood may cause hypoxemia. As well as these respiratory causes, cardiovascular causes such as shunts may also result in hypoxemia.

Hypoxemia is caused by five categories of etiologies: hypoventilation, ventilation/perfusion mismatch, right-to-left shunt, diffusion impairment, and low PO_{2}. Low PO_{2} and hypoventilation are associated with a normal alveolar–arterial gradient (A-a gradient) whereas the other categories are associated with an increased A-a gradient.

=== Ventilation ===
If the alveolar ventilation is low, there will not be enough oxygen delivered to the alveoli for the body's use. This can cause hypoxemia even if the lungs are normal, as the cause is in the brainstem's control of ventilation or in the body's inability to breathe effectively.

==== Respiratory drive ====
Respiration is controlled by centers in the medulla, which influence the rate of breathing and the depth of each breath. This is influenced by the blood level of carbon dioxide, as determined by central and peripheral chemoreceptors located in the central nervous system and carotid and aortic bodies, respectively. Hypoxia occurs when the breathing center doesn't function correctly or when the signal is not appropriate:

- Strokes, epilepsy and cervical neck fractures can all damage the medullary respiratory centres that generates rhythmic impulses and transmit them along the phrenic nerve to the diaphragm, the muscle that is responsible for breathing.
- A decreased respiratory drive can also be the result of metabolic alkalosis, a state of decreased carbon dioxide in the blood
- Central sleep apnea. During sleep, the breathing centers of the brain can pause their activity, leading to prolonged periods of apnea with potentially serious consequences.
- Hyperventilation followed by prolonged breath-holding. This hyperventilation, attempted by some swimmers, reduces the amount of carbon dioxide in the lungs. This reduces the urge to breathe. However, it also means that falling blood oxygen levels are not sensed, and can result in hypoxemia.

==== Physical states ====
A variety of conditions that physically limit airflow can lead to hypoxemia.

- Suffocation, including temporary interruption or cessation of breathing as in obstructive sleep apnea, or bedclothes may interfere with breathing in infants, a putative cause of SIDS.
- Structural deformities of the chest, such as scoliosis and kyphosis, which can restrict breathing and lead to hypoxia.
- Muscle weakness, which may limit the ability of the diaphragm, the primary muscle for drawing new air into lungs, to function. This may be a result of a congenital disease, such as motor neuron disease, or an acquired condition, such as fatigue in severe cases of COPD.

==== Environmental oxygen ====
Oxygen-Hemoglobin Dissassociation Curve.

In conditions where the proportion of oxygen in the air is low, or when the partial pressure of oxygen has decreased, less oxygen is present in the alveoli of the lungs. The alveolar oxygen is transferred to hemoglobin, a carrier protein inside red blood cells, with an efficiency that decreases with the partial pressure of oxygen in the air.

- Altitude. The external partial pressure of oxygen decreases with altitude, for example in areas of high altitude or when flying. This decrease results in decreased carriage of oxygen by hemoglobin. This is particularly seen as a cause of cerebral hypoxia and mountain sickness in climbers of Mount Everest and other peaks of extreme altitude. For example, at the peak of Mount Everest, the partial pressure of oxygen is just 43 mmHg, whereas at sea level the partial pressure is 150 mmHg. For this reason, cabin pressure in aircraft is maintained at 5,000 to 6,000 feet (1500 to 1800 m).
- Diving. Hypoxia in diving can result from sudden surfacing. The partial pressures of gases increases when diving by one ATM every ten metres. This means that a partial pressure of oxygen sufficient to maintain good carriage by hemoglobin is possible at depth, even if it is insufficient at the surface. A diver that remains underwater will slowly consume their oxygen, and when surfacing, the partial pressure of oxygen may be insufficient (shallow water blackout). This may manifest at depth as deep water blackout.
- Suffocation. Decreased concentration of oxygen in inspired air caused by reduced replacement of oxygen in the breathing mix.
- Anaesthetics. Low partial pressure of oxygen in the lungs when switching from inhaled anesthesia to atmospheric air, due to the Fink effect, or diffusion hypoxia.
- Air depleted of oxygen has also proven fatal. In the past, anesthesia machines have malfunctioned, delivering low-oxygen gas mixtures to patients. Additionally, oxygen in a confined space can be consumed if carbon dioxide scrubbers are used without sufficient attention to supplementing the oxygen which has been consumed.
- Hypoxic or anoxic breathing gas mixtures, and exposure to a vacuum or other extreme low pressure environment will remove oxygen from the blood in the alveoli.

=== Perfusion ===
==== Ventilation–perfusion mismatch ====
This refers to a disruption in the ventilation/perfusion equilibrium. Oxygen entering the lungs typically diffuses across the alveolar-capillary membrane into blood. However this equilibration does not occur when the alveolus is insufficiently ventilated, and as a consequence the blood exiting that alveolus is relatively hypoxemic. When such blood is added to blood from well ventilated alveoli, the mix has a lower oxygen partial pressure than the alveolar air, and so the A-a difference develops. Examples of states that can cause a ventilation–perfusion mismatch include:

- Exercise. Whilst modest activity and exercise improves ventilation–perfusion matching, hypoxemia may develop during intense exercise as a result of preexisting lung diseases. During exercise, almost half of the hypoxemia is due to diffusion limitations (again, on average).
- Aging. An increasingly poor match between ventilation and perfusion is seen with age, as well as a decreased ability to compensate for hypoxic states.
- Diseases that affect the pulmonary interstitium can also result in hypoxia, by affecting the ability of oxygen to diffuse into arteries. An example of these diseases is pulmonary fibrosis, where even at rest a fifth of the hypoxemia is due to diffusion limitations (on average).
- Diseases that result in acute or chronic respiratory distress can result in hypoxia. These diseases can be acute in onset (such as obstruction by inhaling something or a pulmonary embolus) or chronic (such as chronic obstructive pulmonary disease).
- Cirrhosis can be complicated by refractory hypoxemia due to high rates of blood flow through the lung, resulting in ventilation–perfusion mismatch.
- Fat embolism syndrome, in which fat droplets are deposited in the pulmonary capillary bed.

==== Shunting ====
Shunting refers to blood that bypasses the pulmonary circulation, meaning that the blood does not receive oxygen from the alveoli. In general, a shunt may be within the heart or lungs, and cannot be corrected by administering oxygen alone. Shunting may occur in normal states:

- Anatomic shunting, occurring via the bronchial circulation, which provides blood to the tissues of the lung. Shunting also occurs by the smallest cardiac veins, which empty directly into the left ventricle.
- Physiological shunts, occur due to the effect of gravity. The highest concentration of blood in the pulmonary circulation occurs in the bases of the pulmonary tree compared to the highest pressure of gas in the apexes of the lungs. Alveoli may not be ventilated in shallow breathing.

Shunting may also occur in disease states:

- Acute respiratory distress syndrome (ARDS). Alveolar collapse, which can increase the amount of physiological shunting, may be managed through a combination of increasing oxygenation as well as positive pressure to recruit collapsed alveoli.
- Pathological shunts such as patent ductus arteriosus, patent foramen ovale, and atrial septal defects or ventricular septal defects. These states are when blood from the right side of the heart moves straight to the left side, without first passing through the lungs. This is known as a right-to-left shunt, which is often congenital in origin.

=== Exercise ===
Exercise-induced arterial hypoxemia occurs during exercise when a trained individual exhibits an arterial oxygen saturation below 93%. It occurs in fit, healthy individuals of varying ages and genders. Adaptations due to training include an increased cardiac output from cardiac hypertrophy, improved venous return, and metabolic vasodilation of muscles, and an increased VO_{2} max. There must be a corresponding increase in VCO_{2} thus a necessity to clear the carbon dioxide to prevent a metabolic acidosis. Hypoxemia occurs in these individuals due to increased pulmonary blood flow causing:

- Reduced capillary transit time due to an increased blood flow within the pulmonary capillary. Capillary transit time (tc), at rest is around 0.8s, allowing plenty of time for the diffusion of oxygen into the circulation and the diffusion of CO_{2} out of the circulation. After training, the capillary volume is still the same however cardiac output is increased, resulting in a decreased capillary transit time, reducing to around 0.16s in trained individuals at maximal work rates. This does not give sufficient time for gas diffusion and results in a hypoxemia.
- Intrapulmonary arteriovenous shunts are dormant capillaries within the lungs that become recruited when venous pressures become too high. They are normally located within deadspace area where gas diffusion does not occur, thus the blood passing through does not become oxygenated resulting in a hypoxemia.

== History ==
The term hypoxemia was originally used to describe low blood oxygen occurring at high altitudes and was defined generally as defective oxygenation of the blood.

In modern times there are a lot of tools to detects hypoxemia including smartwatches. In 2022 a research has shown smartwatches can detect short-time hypoxemia as well as standard medical devices.
