= Chromosome 22 =

Human chromosome

- Human chromosome 22 pair after G-banding. One is from mother, one is from father.

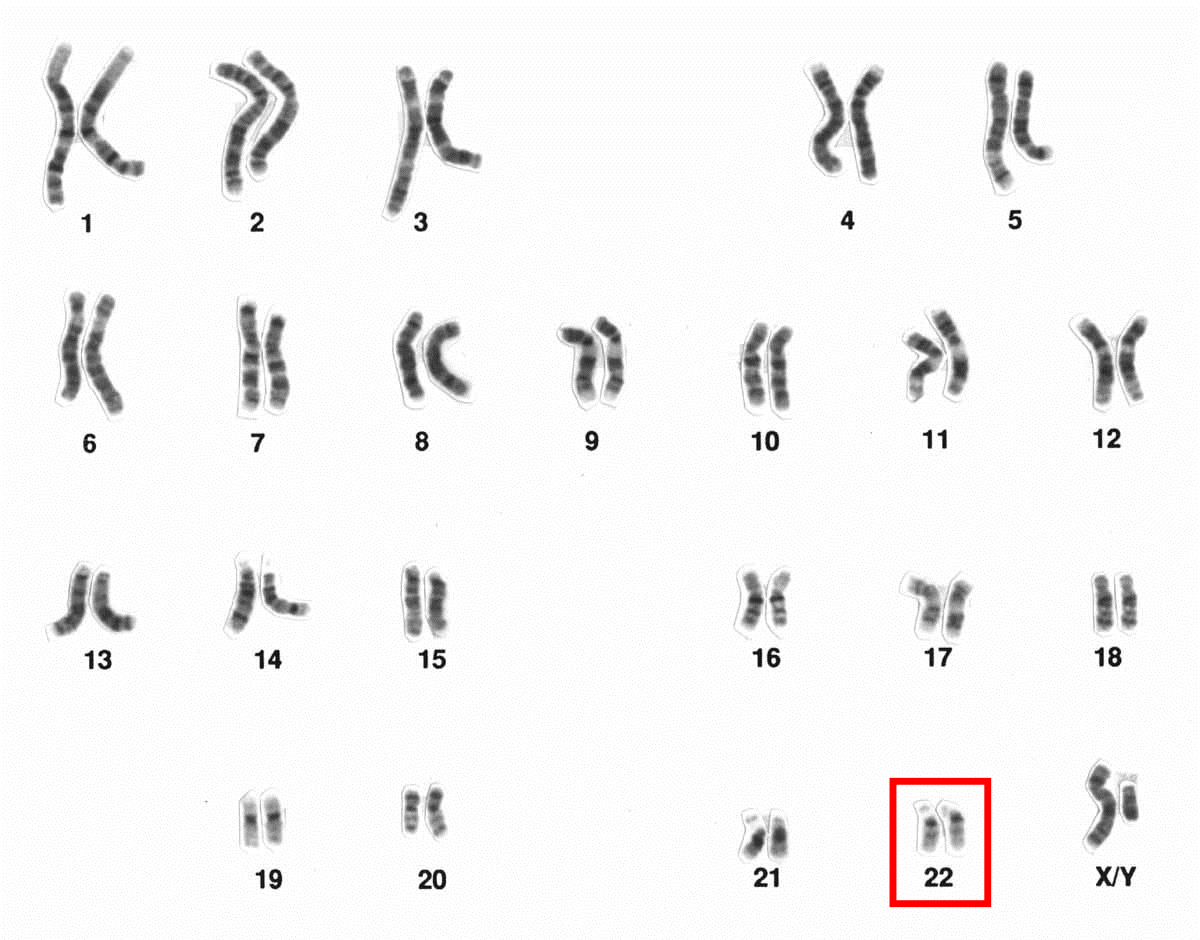
- Chromosome 22 pair in human male karyogram.

Features
- Length (bp): 51,324,926 bp (CHM13)
- No. of genes: 417 (CCDS)
- Type: Autosome
- Centromere position: Acrocentric (15.0 Mbp)

Complete gene lists
- CCDS: Gene list
- HGNC: Gene list
- UniProt: Gene list
- NCBI: Gene list

External map viewers
- Ensembl: Chromosome 22
- Entrez: Chromosome 22
- NCBI: Chromosome 22
- UCSC: Chromosome 22

Full DNA sequences
- RefSeq: NC_000022 (FASTA)
- GenBank: CM000684 (FASTA)

In human genetics and genomics, chromosome 22 is one of the 23 pairs of chromosomes in human cells. Humans normally have two copies of chromosome 22 in each cell. Chromosome 22 is the second smallest human chromosome, spanning about 51 million DNA base pairs and representing between 1.5 and 2% of the total DNA in cells.

In 1999, researchers working on the Human Genome Project announced they had determined the sequence of base pairs that make up this chromosome. Chromosome 22 was the first human chromosome to be fully sequenced.

Human chromosomes are numbered by their apparent size in the karyotype, with chromosome 1 being the largest and chromosome 22 having originally been identified as the smallest. However, genome sequencing has revealed that chromosome 21 is actually smaller than chromosome 22.

== Genes ==
=== Number of genes ===
The following are some of the gene count estimates of human chromosome 22. Because researchers use different approaches to genome annotation, their predictions of the number of genes on each chromosome varies (for technical details, see gene prediction). Among various projects, the collaborative consensus coding sequence project (CCDS) takes an extremely conservative strategy. So CCDS's gene number prediction represents a lower bound on the total number of human protein-coding genes.

Estimated by	Protein-coding genes	Non-coding RNA genes	Pseudogenes	Source	Release date
CCDS	417	—	—		2016-09-08
HGNC	424	161	295		2019-07-08
Ensembl	489	515	325		2017-03-29
UniProt	496	—	—		2018-02-28
NCBI	474	392	379		2017-05-19

=== Gene list ===
The following is a partial list of genes on human chromosome 22. For complete list, see the link in the infobox on the right.

- ADM2: encoding protein ADM2
- APOBEC3B: encoding protein probable DNA dC->dU-editing enzyme APOBEC-3B
- ARFGAP3: encoding protein ADP-ribosylation factor GTPase-activating protein 3
- ASCC2: encoding protein activating signal cointegrator 1 complex subunit 2
- ATF4 (22q13) encoding protein cyclic AMP-dependent transcription factor ATF-4
- BCR (22q11) encoding breakpoint cluster region protein
- CARD10 (22q13) encoding caspase recruitment domain-containing protein 10
- CBX7 (22q13) encoding chromobox protein homolog 7
- CDC42EP1: CDC42 effector protein 1
- CECR1: cat eye syndrome critical region protein 1
- CHEK2 (22q12)
- COMT: Catechol-O-methyltransferase
- CRELD2: cysteine-rich with EGF-like domain protein 2
- CSDC2: cold shock domain-containing protein D2
- CSNK1E: encoding enzyme casein kinase I isoform epsilon or CK1ε,
- DGCR5: encoding a long non-coding RNA
- DGCR6: DiGeorge syndrome critical region gene 6
- EP300
- EP300-AS1
- EWSR1
- TAFA5: family with sequence similarity 19 member A5
- FAM227A: encoding protein FAM227A
- FBLN1
- GTPBP1: GTP-binding protein 1
- HMGXB4: encoding protein HMG-box containing 4
- IFT27: encoding protein intraflagellar transport 27
- IGL@
- IGLJ3 encoding protein immunoglobulin lambda joining 3
- IGLL5: encoding protein immunoglobulin lambda like polypeptide 5
- KIAA0930: encoding uncharacterized protein KIAA0930
- LINC00899 encoding protein long intergenic non-protein coding RNA 899
- MAPK1
- MAPK12
- MCAT: encoding enzyme malonyl CoA-acyl carrier protein transacylase, mitochondrial
- MCM5
- MIF
- MIRLET7BHG: encoding protein MIRLET7B host gene (non-protein coding)
- MKL1
- MMP11
- MN1
- MTP18:
- MYH9
- NF2
- NOL12: encoding protein nucleolar protein 12
- PARVB
- PDGFB
- PI4KA: encoding enzyme phosphatidylinositol 4-kinase alpha
- PI4KAP2: pseudogene phosphatidylinositol 4-kinase alpha pseudogene 2
- PISD: encoding enzyme phosphatidylserine decarboxylase proenzyme
- PNPLA3: encoding enzyme patatin-like phospholipase domain-containing protein 3
- PRAME: encoding protein melanoma antigen preferentially expressed in tumors
- RAC2
- RBX1
- RNR5: encoding RNA, ribosomal 45S cluster 5
- RNU12: encoding protein RNA, U12 small nuclear
- RRP7A: encoding protein ribosomal RNA-processing protein 7 homolog A
- RTCB: encoding protein RNA 2',3'-cyclic phosphate and 5'-OH ligase
- RTL6: encoding protein retrotransposon Gag Like 6
- SAMM50: encoding protein sorting and assembly machinery component 50 homolog
- SEPT3: encoding protein neuronal-specific septin-3
- SEPT5
- SHFM3P1:
- SOX10
- SYNGR1: encoding protein synaptogyrin-1
- TBC1D10A: encoding protein TBC1 domain family member 10A
- TEF: encoding protein thyrotroph embryonic factor
- THAP7: encoding protein THAP domain-containing protein 7
- THOC5: encoding protein THO complex subunit 5 homolog
- TRMU: encoding enzyme mitochondrial tRNA-specific 2-thiouridylase 1
- TTC28: encoding protein tetratricopeptide repeat domain 28
- TTLL1: encoding enzyme probable tubulin polyglutamylase TTLL1
- XRCC6: encoding protein Ku70

Locus	Gene	Description	Condition
22q11.1-q11.2	IGL@	Asymmetric crying facies (Cayler cardiofacial syndrome)	
22q11.21	TBX1	T-box 1	
22q11	RTN4R	Reticulon 4 receptor	Schizophrenia
22q11.21-q11.23	COMT	catechol-O-methyltransferase gene	
22q12.1-q13.1	NEFH	neurofilament, heavy polypeptide 200kDa	
22q12.1	CHEK2	CHK2 checkpoint homolog (S. pombe)	
22q12.2	NF2	neurofibromin 2	bilateral acoustic neuroma
22q13	SOX10	SRY (sex determining region Y)-box 10	
22q13.1	APOL1	Apolipoprotein L1	
22q13.2	EP300	E1A binding protein p300	
22q13.3	WNT7B	Wingless-type MMTV integration site family, member 7B	22q13 deletion syndrome
22q13.3	SHANK3	SH3 and multiple ankyrin repeat domains 3	22q13 deletion syndrome
22q13.3	SULT4A1	sulfotransferase family 4A, member 1	22q13 deletion syndrome
22q13.3	PARVB	parvin beta (cytoskeleton organization and cell adhesion)	22q13 deletion syndrome

== Diseases and disorders ==
The following diseases are some of those related to genes on chromosome 22:

- Amyotrophic lateral sclerosis
- Breast cancer
- Cat eye syndrome
- Chronic myeloid leukemia
- DiGeorge syndrome
- Desmoplastic small round cell tumor
- 22q11.2 distal deletion syndrome
- 22q13 deletion syndrome or Phelan-McDermid syndrome
- Emanuel syndrome
- Ewing sarcoma
- Focal Segmental Glomerulosclerosis
- Li-Fraumeni syndrome
- TANGO2 deficiency
- Metachromatic leukodystrophy
- Methemoglobinemia
- Neurofibromatosis type 2
- Opitz G/BBB syndrome
- Renal medullary carcinoma
- Rubinstein-Taybi syndrome
- Waardenburg syndrome
- Schizophrenia

== Chromosomal conditions ==
The following conditions are caused by changes in the structure or number of copies of chromosome 22:

- 22q11.2 deletion syndrome: Most people with 22q11.2 deletion syndrome are missing about 3 million base pairs on one copy of chromosome 22 in each cell. The deletion occurs near the middle of the chromosome at a location designated as q11.2. This region contains about 30 genes, but many of these genes have not been well characterized. A small percentage of affected individuals have shorter deletions in the same region.
  The loss of one particular gene, TBX1, is thought to be responsible for many of the characteristic features of 22q11.2 deletion syndrome, such as heart defects, an opening in the roof of the mouth (a cleft palate), distinctive facial features, and low calcium levels. A loss of this gene does not appear to cause learning disabilities, however. Other genes in the deleted region are also likely to contribute to the signs and symptoms of 22q11.2 deletion syndrome.
- 22q11.2 distal deletion syndrome
- 22q13 deletion syndrome
- Other chromosomal conditions: Other changes in the number or structure of chromosome 22 can have a variety of effects, including intellectual disability, delayed development, physical abnormalities, and other medical problems. These changes include an extra piece of chromosome 22 in each cell (partial trisomy), a missing segment of the chromosome in each cell (partial monosomy), and a circular structure called ring chromosome 22 that is caused by the breakage and reattachment of both ends of the chromosome.
- Cat-eye syndrome is a rare disorder most often caused by a chromosomal change called an inverted duplicated 22. A small extra chromosome is made up of genetic material from chromosome 22 that has been abnormally duplicated (copied). The extra genetic material causes the characteristic signs and symptoms of cat-eye syndrome, including an eye abnormality called ocular iris coloboma (a gap or split in the colored part of the eye), small skin tags or pits in front of the ear, heart defects, kidney problems, and, in some cases, delayed development.
- A rearrangement (translocation) of genetic material between chromosomes 9 and 22 is associated with several types of blood cancer (leukemia). This chromosomal abnormality, which is commonly called the Philadelphia chromosome, is found only in cancer cells. The Philadelphia chromosome has been identified in most cases of a slowly progressing form of blood cancer called chronic myeloid leukemia, or CML. It also has been found in some cases of more rapidly progressing blood cancers (acute leukemias). The presence of the Philadelphia chromosome can help predict how the cancer will progress and provides a target for molecular therapies.
- Emanuel syndrome is a translocation of chromosomes 11 and 22. Originally known as supernumerary der (22) syndrome, it occurs when an individual has an extra chromosome composed of pieces of the 11th and 22nd chromosomes.

== Cytogenetic band ==
G-banding ideograms of human chromosome 22

G-banding ideogram of human chromosome 22 in resolution 850 bphs. Band length in this diagram is proportional to base-pair length. This type of ideogram is generally used in genome browsers (e.g. Ensembl, UCSC Genome Browser).

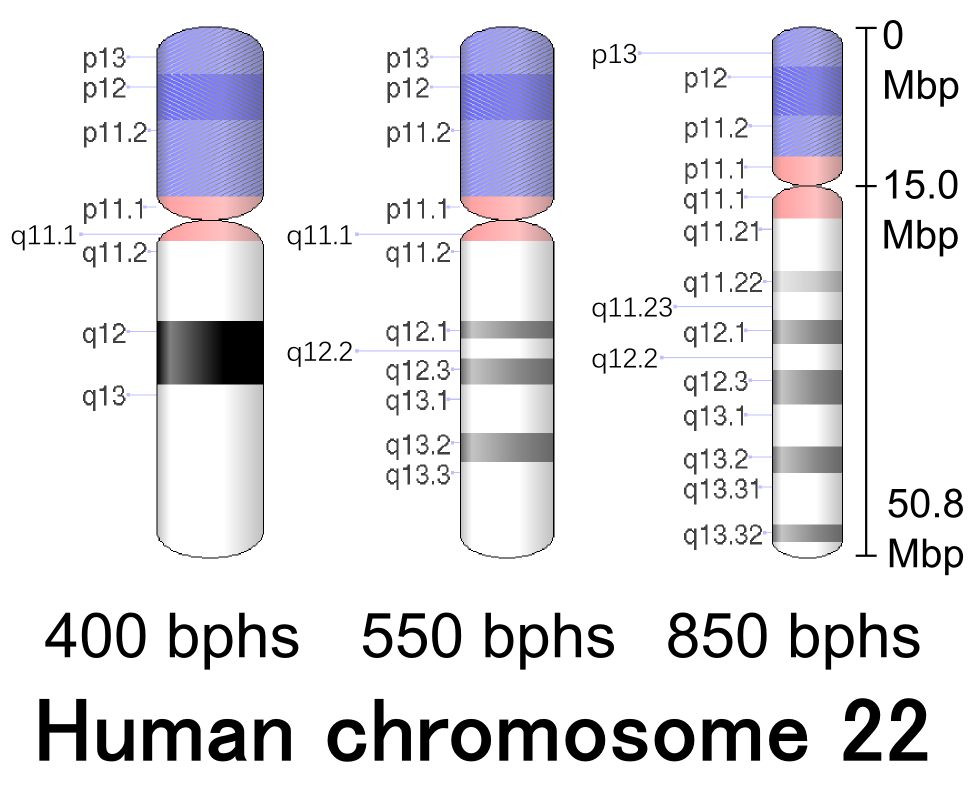
G-banding patterns of human chromosome 22 in three different resolutions (400, 550 and 850). Band length in this diagram is based on the ideograms from ISCN (2013). This type of ideogram represents actual relative band length observed under a microscope at the different moments during the mitotic process.

G-bands of human chromosome 22 in resolution 850 bphs
Chr.	Arm	Band	ISCN start	ISCN stop	Basepair start	Basepair stop	Stain	Density
22	p	13	0	260	1	4,300,000	gvar	
22	p	12	260	576	4,300,001	9,400,000	stalk	
22	p	11.2	576	836	9,400,001	13,700,000	gvar	
22	p	11.1	836	1015	13,700,001	15,000,000	acen	
22	q	11.1	1015	1234	15,000,001	17,400,000	acen	
22	q	11.21	1234	1563	17,400,001	21,700,000	gneg	
22	q	11.22	1563	1700	21,700,001	23,100,000	gpos	25
22	q	11.23	1700	1878	23,100,001	25,500,000	gneg	
22	q	12.1	1878	2029	25,500,001	29,200,000	gpos	50
22	q	12.2	2029	2194	29,200,001	31,800,000	gneg	
22	q	12.3	2194	2413	31,800,001	37,200,000	gpos	50
22	q	13.1	2413	2687	37,200,001	40,600,000	gneg	
22	q	13.2	2687	2852	40,600,001	43,800,000	gpos	50
22	q	13.31	2852	3181	43,800,001	48,100,000	gneg	
22	q	13.32	3181	3290	48,100,001	49,100,000	gpos	50
22	q	13.33	3290	3400	49,100,001	50,818,468	gneg	
