= ARFGAP3 =

Protein-coding gene in the species Homo sapiens

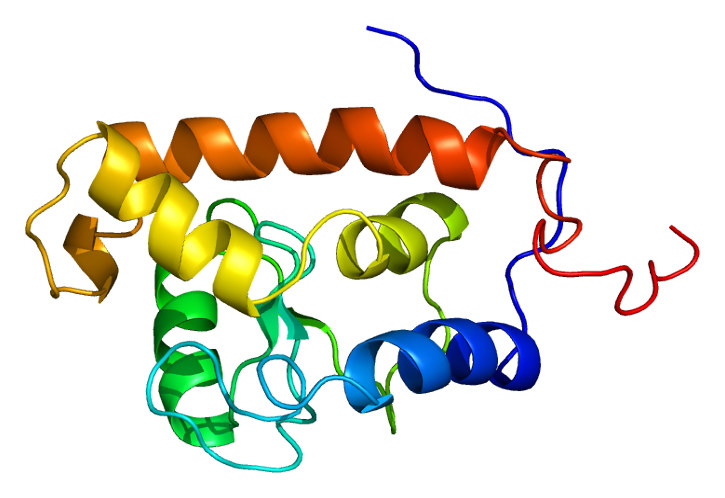

Identifiers
- Aliases: ARFGAP3, ARFGAP1, ADP ribosylation factor GTPase activating protein 3
- External IDs: OMIM: 612439; MGI: 1913501; GeneCards: ARFGAP3
Available structures
PDB	Ortholog search: PDBe RCSB
PDB	List of PDB id codes 2CRW

Gene location (Human)
Chr.	Chromosome 22 (human)
Band	22q13.2	Start	42,796,502 bp
Band	22q13.2	End	42,858,106 bp

Gene location (Mouse)
Chr.	Chromosome 15 (mouse)
Band	15|15 E1	Start	83,183,940 bp
Band	15|15 E1	End	83,234,448 bp
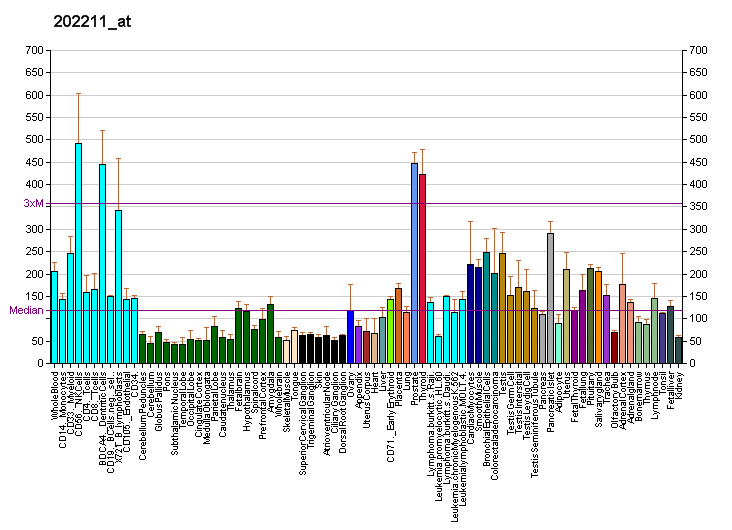
RNA expression pattern
Bgee	Human / Mouse (ortholog); Top expressed in: jejunal mucosa; parotid gland; body of pancreas; Achilles tendon; tibia; right adrenal cortex; left adrenal gland; left adrenal cortex; cartilage tissue; corpus epididymis / Top expressed in: lacrimal gland; seminal vesicula; salivary gland; parotid gland; islet of Langerhans; submandibular gland; spermatocyte; transitional epithelium of urinary bladder; duodenum; spermatid; More reference expression data
BioGPS	More reference expression data
Gene ontology
Molecular function	protein binding; metal ion binding; GTPase activator activity
Cellular component	cytosol; Golgi membrane; Golgi apparatus; membrane; cytoplasm; endoplasmic reticulum-Golgi intermediate compartment; trans-Golgi network; COPI vesicle coat
Biological process	protein transport; endoplasmic reticulum to Golgi vesicle-mediated transport; intracellular protein transport; vesicle-mediated transport; protein secretion; retrograde vesicle-mediated transport, Golgi to endoplasmic reticulum; positive regulation of GTPase activity; transport; COPI coating of Golgi vesicle
Sources:Amigo / QuickGO
Orthologs
Databases	NCBI: entry; OMA: entry
Species	Human	Mouse
Entrez	26286	66251
Ensembl	ENSG00000242247	ENSMUSG00000054277
UniProt	Q9NP61	Q9D8S3
RefSeq (mRNA)	NM_001142293; NM_014570	NM_025445; NM_001357756; NM_001357757
RefSeq (protein)	NP_001135765; NP_055385	NP_079721; NP_001344685; NP_001344686
Location (UCSC)	Chr 22: 42.8 – 42.86 Mb	Chr 15: 83.18 – 83.23 Mb
PubMed search
- Wikidata
View/Edit Human	View/Edit Mouse

ADP-ribosylation factor GTPase-activating protein 3 is a protein that in humans is encoded by the ARFGAP3 gene.

The protein encoded by this gene is a GTPase-activating protein (GAP) which associates with the Golgi apparatus and which is thought to interact with ADP-ribosylation factor 1 (ARF1). The encoded protein likely promotes hydrolysis of ARF1-bound GTP, which is required for the dissociation of coat proteins from Golgi-derived membranes and vesicles. Dissociation of the coat proteins is a prerequisite for the fusion of these vesicles with target compartments. The activity of this protein is sensitive to phospholipids. This gene was originally known as ARFGAP1, but that is now the name of a related but different gene.
