= Tef =

Tef or TEF may refer to:

- Eragrostis tef, a cereal from Ethiopia
- Teaching Excellence Framework, a UK government assessment of the quality of undergraduate teaching in universities
- Telefónica (stock symbol TEF)
- Tennessee Ernie Ford (1919–1991), American singer
- Test d'évaluation du français, a test of fluency in French
- The Elias Fund, a nonprofit organization empowering development in Zimbabwean youth
- The Endless Forest, an online game
- Thermic effect of food, an increment of energy expenditure
- TEF (gene), Thyrotrophic embryonic factor, a human gene
- Total enclosure fetishism, a form of sexual fetishism
- Toxic equivalency factor for dioxins and dioxin-like compounds
- Tracheoesophageal fistula, a medical condition
- Transeuropa Ferries, a defunct ferry operator
- Textual Editing Framework, a textual modeling tool for the Eclipse Modeling Framework software engineering facility
- Telfer Airport, IATA airport code "TEF"
