= SYNGR1 =

Protein-coding gene in the species Homo sapiens

Identifiers
- Aliases: SYNGR1, synaptogyrin 1
- External IDs: OMIM: 603925; MGI: 1328323; GeneCards: SYNGR1

Gene location (Human)
Chr.	Chromosome 22 (human)
Band	22q13.1	Start	39,349,925 bp
Band	22q13.1	End	39,385,575 bp

Gene location (Mouse)
Chr.	Chromosome 15 (mouse)
Band	15|15 E1	Start	79,975,535 bp
Band	15|15 E1	End	80,003,702 bp
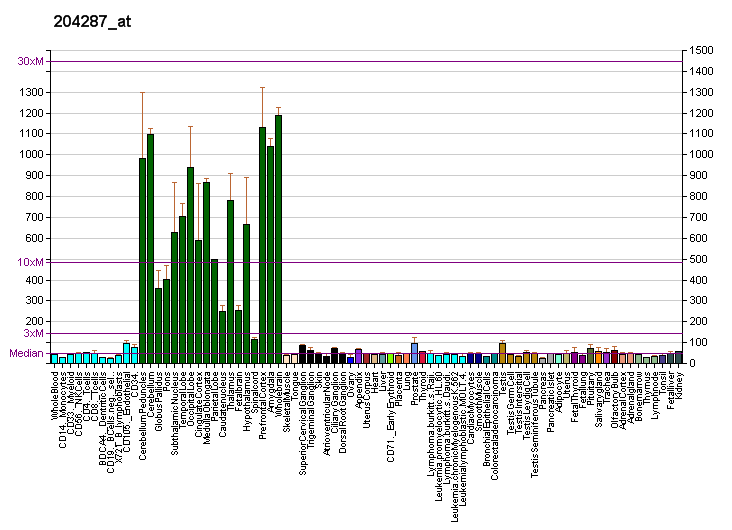

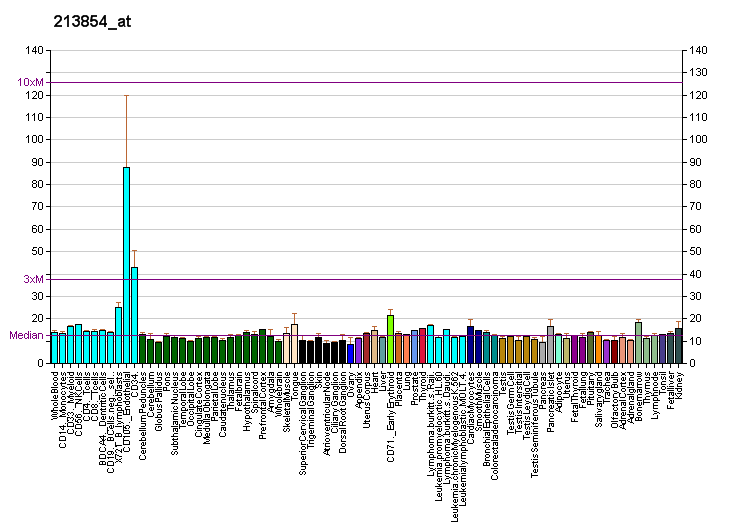

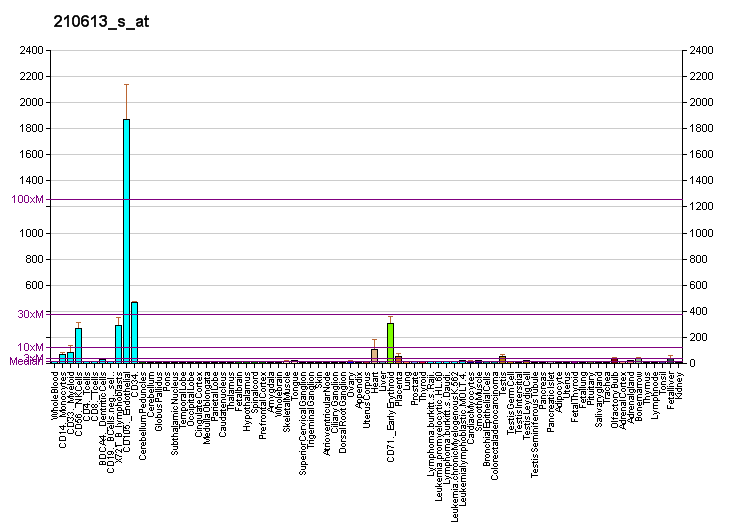
RNA expression pattern
Bgee	Human / Mouse (ortholog); Top expressed in: Brodmann area 10; right hemisphere of cerebellum; paraflocculus of cerebellum; frontal pole; right frontal lobe; lateral nuclear group of thalamus; cerebellar vermis; cingulate gyrus; anterior cingulate cortex; Brodmann area 9 / Top expressed in: dentate gyrus of hippocampal formation granule cell; superior frontal gyrus; cerebellar cortex; prefrontal cortex; subiculum; medial dorsal nucleus; dorsal tegmental nucleus; medial vestibular nucleus; medial geniculate nucleus; cerebellar vermis; More reference expression data
BioGPS	More reference expression data
Gene ontology
Molecular function	protein binding
Cellular component	melanosome; integral component of membrane; cell junction; neuromuscular junction; synapse; synaptic vesicle membrane; membrane; synaptic vesicle; plasma membrane; azurophil granule membrane; cytoplasmic vesicle; integral component of synaptic vesicle membrane
Biological process	regulation of short-term neuronal synaptic plasticity; protein targeting; regulation of long-term neuronal synaptic plasticity; neutrophil degranulation; cellular response to leukemia inhibitory factor; regulated exocytosis; synaptic vesicle membrane organization
Sources:Amigo / QuickGO
Orthologs
Databases	NCBI: entry; OMA: entry
Species	Human	Mouse
Entrez	9145	20972
Ensembl	ENSG00000100321	ENSMUSG00000022415
UniProt	O43759	O55100
RefSeq (mRNA)	NM_145738; NM_004711; NM_145731	NM_009303; NM_207708
RefSeq (protein)	NP_004702; NP_663783; NP_663791	NP_033329; NP_997591
Location (UCSC)	Chr 22: 39.35 – 39.39 Mb	Chr 15: 79.98 – 80 Mb
PubMed search
- Wikidata
View/Edit Human	View/Edit Mouse

Synaptogyrin-1 is a protein that in humans is encoded by the SYNGR1 gene.

This gene encodes an integral membrane protein associated with presynaptic vesicles in neuronal cells. The exact function of this protein is unclear, but studies of a similar murine protein suggest that it functions in synaptic plasticity without being required for synaptic transmission. The gene product belongs to the synaptogyrin gene family. Three alternatively spliced variants encoding three different isoforms have been identified.
