= TTLL1 =

Protein-coding gene in the species Homo sapiens

Identifiers
- Aliases: TTLL1, C22orf7, HS323M22B, tubulin tyrosine ligase like 1, TTL family tubulin polyglutamylase complex subunit L1, TPGS3
- External IDs: OMIM: 608955; MGI: 2443047; GeneCards: TTLL1

Gene location (Human)
Chr.	Chromosome 22 (human)
Band	22q13.2	Start	43,039,516 bp
Band	22q13.2	End	43,089,419 bp

Gene location (Mouse)
Chr.	Chromosome 15 (mouse)
Band	15|15 E1	Start	83,367,970 bp
Band	15|15 E1	End	83,395,094 bp
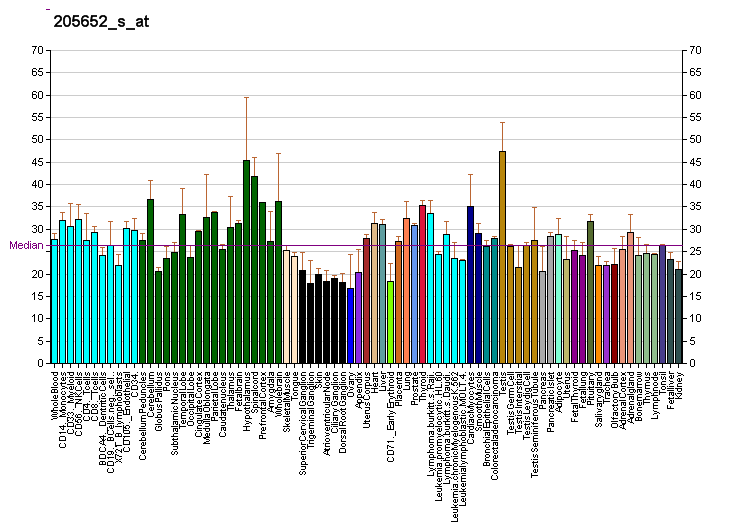
RNA expression pattern
Bgee	Human / Mouse (ortholog); Top expressed in: gonad; ganglionic eminence; bronchial epithelial cell; ventricular zone; testicle; mucosa of paranasal sinus; prefrontal cortex; frontal pole; right uterine tube; oocyte / Top expressed in: myocardium of ventricle; interventricular septum; right ventricle; Rostral migratory stream; cardiac muscles; facial motor nucleus; anterior horn of spinal cord; dorsomedial hypothalamic nucleus; median eminence; paraventricular nucleus of hypothalamus; More reference expression data
BioGPS	More reference expression data
Gene ontology
Molecular function	nucleotide binding; ligase activity; ATP binding; tubulin-glutamic acid ligase activity
Cellular component	cytoplasm; microtubule; cytoskeleton; extracellular region
Biological process	epithelial cilium movement involved in extracellular fluid movement; protein polyglutamylation; axoneme assembly; sperm axoneme assembly
Sources:Amigo / QuickGO
Orthologs
Databases	NCBI: entry; OMA: entry
Species	Human	Mouse
Entrez	25809	319953
Ensembl	ENSG00000100271	ENSMUSG00000022442
UniProt	O95922	Q91V51
RefSeq (mRNA)	NM_001008572; NM_012263	NM_178869; NM_001357953
RefSeq (protein)	NP_036395	NP_849200; NP_001344882
Location (UCSC)	Chr 22: 43.04 – 43.09 Mb	Chr 15: 83.37 – 83.4 Mb
PubMed search
- Wikidata
View/Edit Human	View/Edit Mouse

Probable tubulin polyglutamylase TTLL1 is an enzyme that in humans is encoded by the TTLL1 gene.
