= ASCC2 =

Protein-coding gene in the species Homo sapiens

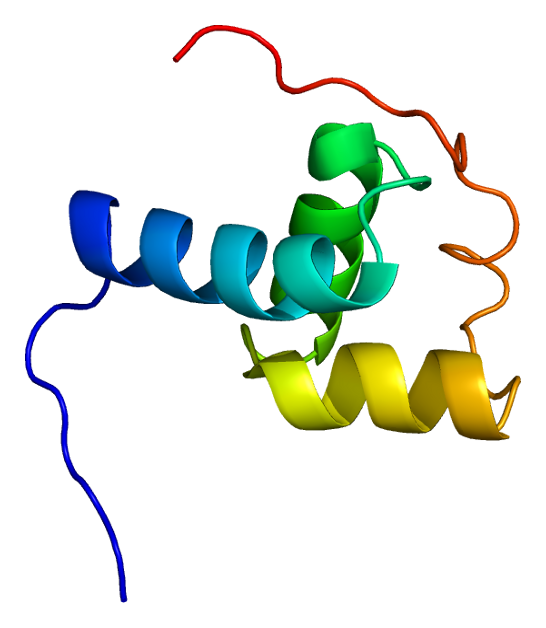

Identifiers
- Aliases: ASCC2, ASC1p100, p100, activating signal cointegrator 1 complex subunit 2
- External IDs: OMIM: 614216; MGI: 1922702; GeneCards: ASCC2
Available structures
PDB	Ortholog search: PDBe RCSB
PDB	List of PDB id codes 2DI0

Gene location (Human)
Chr.	Chromosome 22 (human)
Band	22q12.2	Start	29,788,609 bp
Band	22q12.2	End	29,838,304 bp

Gene location (Mouse)
Chr.	Chromosome 11 (mouse)
Band	11|11 A1	Start	4,587,747 bp
Band	11|11 A1	End	4,635,699 bp
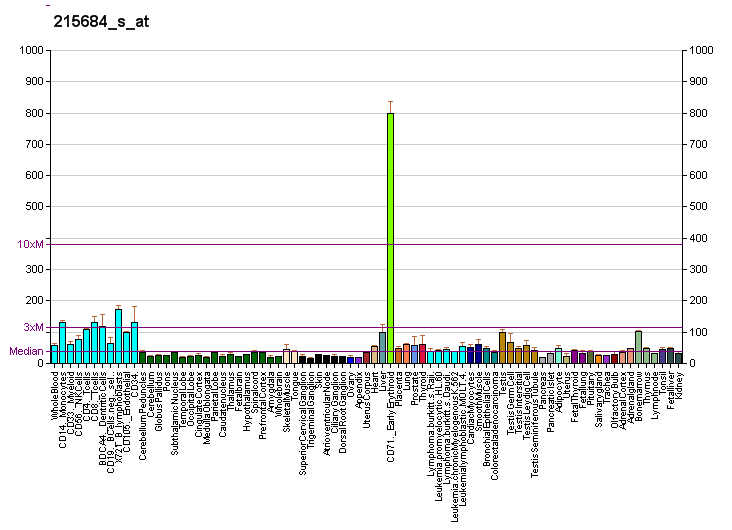
RNA expression pattern
Bgee	Human / Mouse (ortholog); Top expressed in: granulocyte; blood; minor salivary glands; right lobe of thyroid gland; right lobe of liver; left lobe of thyroid gland; mucosa of transverse colon; body of stomach; left adrenal cortex; right adrenal gland / Top expressed in: Paneth cell; ciliary body; yolk sac; urothelium; transitional epithelium of urinary bladder; internal carotid artery; external carotid artery; cumulus cell; lens; retinal pigment epithelium; More reference expression data
BioGPS	More reference expression data
Orthologs
Databases	NCBI: entry; OMA: entry
Species	Human	Mouse
Entrez	84164	75452
Ensembl	ENSG00000100325	ENSMUSG00000020412
UniProt	Q9H1I8	Q91WR3
RefSeq (mRNA)	NM_001242906; NM_032204	NM_029291; NM_001376980
RefSeq (protein)	NP_001229835; NP_115580; NP_001356849; NP_001356850; NP_001356851 NP_001356852; NP_001356853; NP_001356854; NP_001356855; NP_001356856; NP_001356857; NP_001356858; NP_001356859; NP_001356860; NP_001356861; NP_001356862; NP_001356863; NP_001356864; NP_001356865; NP_001356866; NP_001356867; NP_001356868; NP_001356869; NP_001356870; NP_001356871; NP_001356872; NP_001356873; NP_001356874; NP_001356875; NP_001356876; NP_001356877; NP_001356878; NP_001356879	NP_083567; NP_001363909
Location (UCSC)	Chr 22: 29.79 – 29.84 Mb	Chr 11: 4.59 – 4.64 Mb
PubMed search
- Wikidata
View/Edit Human	View/Edit Mouse

Activating signal cointegrator 1 complex subunit 2 is a protein that in humans is encoded by the ASCC2 gene. Also known as p100 or ASC-1 complex subunit p100, is a protein encoded by the ASCC2 gene in humans. It is a component of the activating signal cointegrator 1 complex (ASCC) and functions as a ubiquitin-binding protein involved in DNA damage repair and ribosome-associated quality control.

== Function ==
ASCC2 recognizes proteins modified with K63-linked polyubiquitin chains, a molecular signal that helps recruit other components of the ASCC complex to sites of DNA damage. Through this activity, it contributes to the recruitment of proteins involved in DNA repair. ASCC2 also participates in the cellular response to stalled ribosomes, helping recruit the ribosome quality control trigger complex (RQT), which promotes the disassembly of stalled ribosomes and the removal of incomplete protein products. In addition, ASCC2 has been associated with the regulation of transcription as part of the ASC-1 complex.
