= IGLL5 =

Protein-coding gene in the species Homo sapiens

Identifiers
- Aliases: IGLL5, IGL, IGLV, VL-MAR, immunoglobulin lambda like polypeptide 5
- External IDs: MGI: 96529; GeneCards: IGLL5

Gene location (Human)
Chr.	Chromosome 22 (human)
Band	22q11.22	Start	22,887,780 bp
Band	22q11.22	End	22,896,111 bp

Gene location (Mouse)
Chr.	Chromosome 16 (mouse)
Band	16 A3|16 10.45 cM	Start	16,678,535 bp
Band	16 A3|16 10.45 cM	End	16,681,849 bp
RNA expression pattern
Bgee	Human / Mouse (ortholog); Top expressed in: duodenum; rectum; bone marrow cell; mucosa of transverse colon; lymph node; spleen; tonsil; appendix; olfactory zone of nasal mucosa; salivary gland / Top expressed in: bone marrow; granulocyte; embryo; choroid plexus; brown adipose tissue; choroid plexus of fourth ventricle; Region I of hippocampus proper; inferior colliculi; secondary oocyte; CA3 field; More reference expression data
BioGPS	n/a
Gene ontology
Molecular function	immunoglobulin receptor binding; antigen binding
Cellular component	extracellular region; blood microparticle; extracellular exosome; external side of plasma membrane; immunoglobulin complex, circulating
Biological process	B cell receptor signaling pathway; phagocytosis, recognition; positive regulation of B cell activation; phagocytosis, engulfment; innate immune response; defense response to bacterium; complement activation, classical pathway
Sources:Amigo / QuickGO
Orthologs
Databases	NCBI: entry; OMA: entry
Species	Human	Mouse
Entrez	100423062	16136
Ensembl	ENSG00000254709	ENSMUSG00000075370
UniProt	B9A064	P20764
RefSeq (mRNA)	NM_001256296; NM_001178126	NM_001190325
RefSeq (protein)	NP_001171597; NP_001243225	NP_001177254
Location (UCSC)	Chr 22: 22.89 – 22.9 Mb	Chr 16: 16.68 – 16.68 Mb
PubMed search
- Wikidata
View/Edit Human	View/Edit Mouse

Immunoglobulin lambda like polypeptide 5 is a protein that in humans is encoded by the IGLL5 gene.

== Function ==
This gene encodes one of the immunoglobulin lambda-like polypeptides. It is located within the immunoglobulin lambda locus but does not require somatic rearrangement for expression. The first exon of this gene is unrelated to immunoglobulin variable genes; the second and third exons correspond to the immunoglobulin lambda joining 1 and the immunoglobulin lambda constant 1 gene segments. Alternative splicing results in multiple transcript variants. [provided by RefSeq, May 2010].
