= RRP7A =

Protein-coding gene in the species Homo sapiens

Identifiers
- Aliases: RRP7A, BK126B4.3, CGI-96, CTA-126B4.3, ribosomal RNA processing 7 homolog A, Rrp7, MCPH28
- External IDs: MGI: 1922028; GeneCards: RRP7A

Gene location (Human)
| Chr. | Chromosome 22 (human) |
| Band | 22q13.2 | Start | 42,508,344 bp |
| Band | 22q13.2 | End | 42,519,796 bp |

Gene location (Mouse)
| Chr. | Chromosome 15 (mouse) |
| Band | 15|15 E1 | Start | 82,997,634 bp |
| Band | 15|15 E1 | End | 83,007,002 bp |
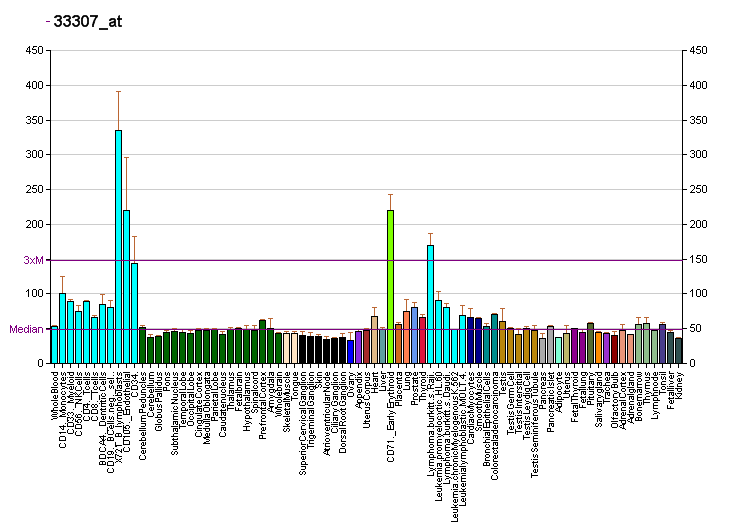

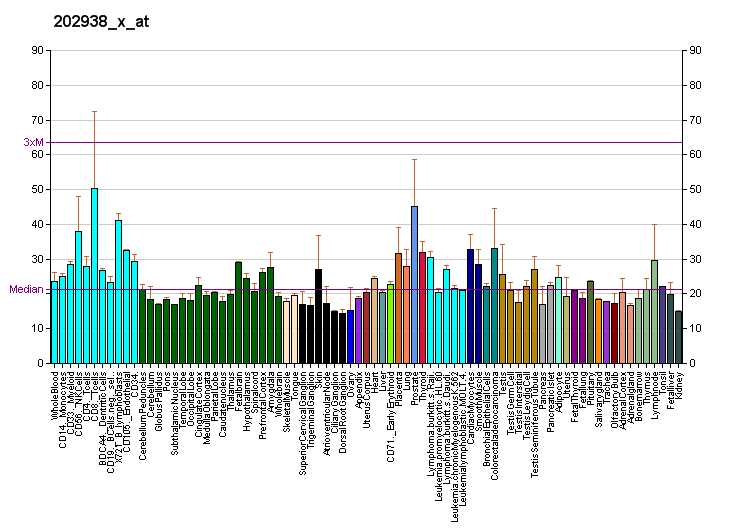

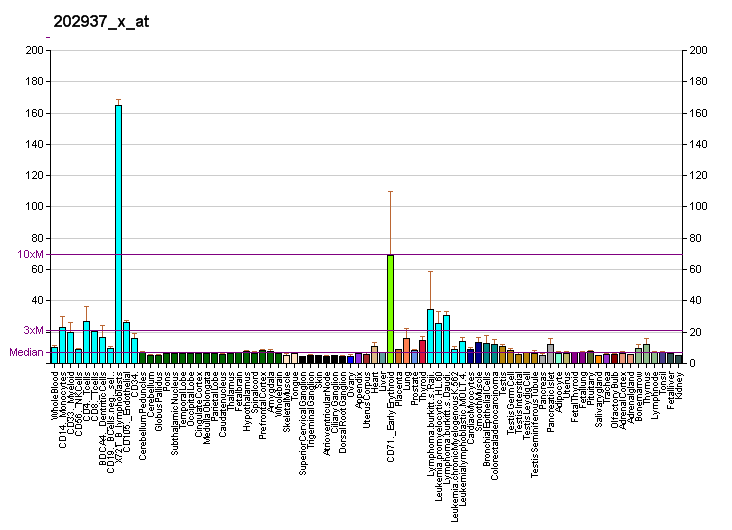
RNA expression pattern
| Bgee | Human / Mouse (ortholog); Top expressed in: mucosa of transverse colon; granulocyte; apex of heart; sural nerve; stromal cell of endometrium; monocyte; left adrenal cortex; anterior cingulate cortex; ganglionic eminence; body of stomach / Top expressed in: dentate gyrus of hippocampal formation granule cell; yolk sac; superior frontal gyrus; primary visual cortex; ventricular zone; neural layer of retina; esophagus; spermatocyte; lip; muscle of thigh; More reference expression data |
| BioGPS | More reference expression data |
Gene ontology
| Molecular function | protein binding; nucleic acid binding; RNA binding |
| Cellular component | UTP-C complex; cytoplasm; CURI complex; nucleoplasm |
| Biological process | blastocyst formation; ribosomal small subunit assembly; rRNA processing |
Sources:Amigo / QuickGO
Orthologs
| Databases | NCBI: entry; OMA: entry |
| Species | Human | Mouse |
| Entrez | 27341 | 74778 |
| Ensembl | ENSG00000189306 | ENSMUSG00000018040 |
| UniProt | Q9Y3A4 | Q9D1C9 |
| RefSeq (mRNA) | NM_015703 | NM_029101; NM_001358061 |
| RefSeq (protein) | NP_056518 | NP_083377; NP_001344990 |
| Location (UCSC) | Chr 22: 42.51 – 42.52 Mb | Chr 15: 83 – 83.01 Mb |
| PubMed search |
- Wikidata
| View/Edit Human | View/Edit Mouse |

Ribosomal RNA-processing protein 7 homolog A is a protein that in humans is encoded by the RRP7A gene. The RRP7A protein is a multi-functional protein involved in RNA processing. Activities include cilium disassembly, localizing proteins to the nucleolus, and ribosome biogenesis.
