= PI4KAP2 =

Pseudogene in the species Homo sapiens

Identifiers
- Aliases: PI4KAP2, phosphatidylinositol 4-kinase alpha pseudogene 2
- External IDs: GeneCards: PI4KAP2; OMA:PI4KAP2 - orthologs

Gene location (Human)
Chr.	Chromosome 22 (human)
Band	22q11.21	Start	21,473,000 bp
Band	22q11.21	End	21,517,533 bp
RNA expression pattern
Bgee	Human / Mouse (ortholog); Top expressed in: left ovary; right ovary; pituitary gland; right lobe of thyroid gland; granulocyte; right frontal lobe; left lobe of thyroid gland; body of uterus; right hemisphere of cerebellum; sural nerve / n/a; More reference expression data
BioGPS	n/a
Orthologs
Species	Human	Mouse
Entrez	375133	n/a
Ensembl	ENSG00000183506	n/a
UniProt	n a	n/a
RefSeq (mRNA)	n/a	n/a
RefSeq (protein)	n/a	n/a
Location (UCSC)	Chr 22: 21.47 – 21.52 Mb	n/a
PubMed search		n/a
- Wikidata
View/Edit Human

Putative phosphatidylinositol 4-kinase alpha-like protein P2 is an enzyme that in humans is encoded by the PI4KAP2 gene.
