= GTPBP1 =

Protein-coding gene in the species Homo sapiens

Identifiers
- Aliases: GTPBP1, GP-1, GP1, HSPC018, GTP binding protein 1
- External IDs: OMIM: 602245; MGI: 109443; GeneCards: GTPBP1
Enzyme activity
EC #	BRENDA	ExPASy	KEGG	MetaCyc
3.6.5.3	↗	↗	↗	↗

Gene location (Human)
Chr.	Chromosome 22 (human)
Band	22q13.1	Start	38,705,742 bp
Band	22q13.1	End	38,738,299 bp

Gene location (Mouse)
Chr.	Chromosome 15 (mouse)
Band	15|15 E1	Start	79,575,046 bp
Band	15|15 E1	End	79,605,680 bp
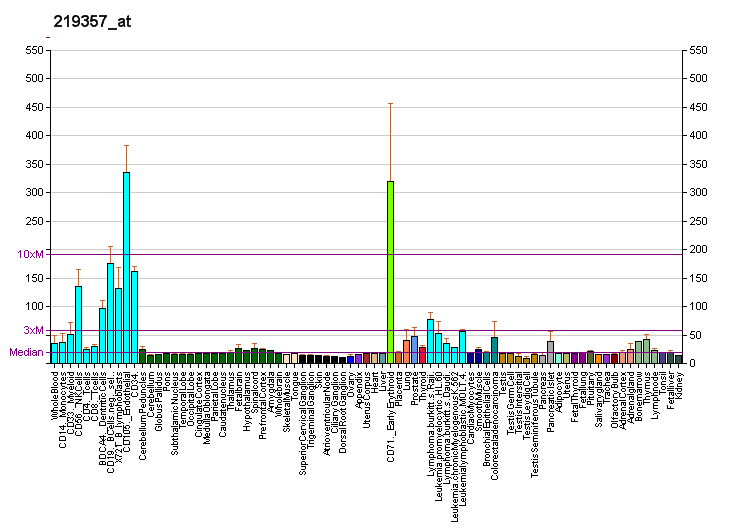
RNA expression pattern
Bgee	Human / Mouse (ortholog); Top expressed in: sural nerve; gastric mucosa; ventricular zone; ganglionic eminence; right uterine tube; left lobe of thyroid gland; skin of leg; popliteal artery; tibial arteries; left ovary / Top expressed in: neural layer of retina; granulocyte; dentate gyrus of hippocampal formation granule cell; lip; ventricular zone; thymus; secondary oocyte; fetal liver hematopoietic progenitor cell; zygote; molar; More reference expression data
BioGPS	More reference expression data
Gene ontology
Molecular function	nucleotide binding; GTP binding; RNA binding; GTPase activity; translation elongation factor activity
Cellular component	cytoplasm; cytoplasmic exosome (RNase complex); cytosol; membrane
Biological process	positive regulation of mRNA catabolic process; immune response; signal transduction; GTP metabolic process; translational elongation
Sources:Amigo / QuickGO
Orthologs
Databases	NCBI: entry; OMA: entry
Species	Human	Mouse
Entrez	9567	14904
Ensembl	ENSG00000100226	ENSMUSG00000042535
UniProt	O00178	O08582
RefSeq (mRNA)	NM_004286	NM_013818
RefSeq (protein)	NP_004277	NP_038846
Location (UCSC)	Chr 22: 38.71 – 38.74 Mb	Chr 15: 79.58 – 79.61 Mb
PubMed search
- Wikidata
View/Edit Human	View/Edit Mouse

GTP-binding protein 1 is a protein that in humans is encoded by the GTPBP1 gene.

This gene is upregulated by interferon-gamma and encodes a protein that is a member of the AGP11/GTPBP1 family of GTP-binding proteins. A structurally similar protein has been found in mice, where disruption of the gene for that protein had no observable phenotype.
