= CDC42EP1 =

Protein-coding gene in humans

Identifiers
- Aliases: CDC42EP1, BORG5, CEP1, MSE55, CDC42 effector protein 1
- External IDs: OMIM: 606084; MGI: 1929763; GeneCards: CDC42EP1

Gene location (Human)
Chr.	Chromosome 22 (human)
Band	22q13.1	Start	37,560,480 bp
Band	22q13.1	End	37,569,405 bp

Gene location (Mouse)
Chr.	Chromosome 15 (mouse)
Band	15|15 E1	Start	78,726,824 bp
Band	15|15 E1	End	78,735,097 bp
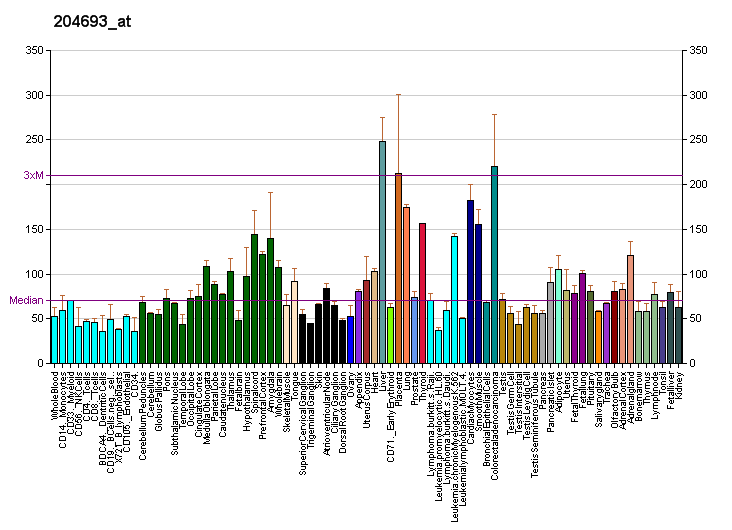
RNA expression pattern
Bgee	Human / Mouse (ortholog); Top expressed in: body of pancreas; body of stomach; C1 segment; minor salivary glands; right coronary artery; left adrenal cortex; left uterine tube; right adrenal gland; ascending aorta; ectocervix / Top expressed in: epithelium of stomach; left lung; left lung lobe; right lung; lacrimal gland; pyloric antrum; white adipose tissue; right lung lobe; subcutaneous adipose tissue; interventricular septum; More reference expression data
BioGPS	More reference expression data
Gene ontology
Molecular function	protein binding; GTPase activator activity; cadherin binding involved in cell-cell adhesion
Cellular component	cytoskeleton; membrane; endomembrane system; focal adhesion; cytoplasm; plasma membrane
Biological process	positive regulation of pseudopodium assembly; positive regulation of actin filament polymerization; Rho protein signal transduction; regulation of cell shape; positive regulation of GTPase activity; cell-cell adhesion
Sources:Amigo / QuickGO
Orthologs
Databases	NCBI: entry; OMA: entry
Species	Human	Mouse
Entrez	11135	104445
Ensembl	ENSG00000128283	ENSMUSG00000049521
UniProt	Q00587	Q91W92
RefSeq (mRNA)	NM_152243	NM_027219
RefSeq (protein)	NP_689449	NP_081495
Location (UCSC)	Chr 22: 37.56 – 37.57 Mb	Chr 15: 78.73 – 78.74 Mb
PubMed search
- Wikidata
View/Edit Human	View/Edit Mouse

Cdc42 effector protein 1 is a protein that in humans is encoded by the CDC42EP1 gene.

CDC42 is a member of the Rho GTPase family that regulates multiple cellular activities, including actin polymerization. The protein encoded by this gene is a CDC42 binding protein that mediates actin cytoskeleton reorganization at the plasma membrane. The encoded protein, which is secreted, is primarily found in bone marrow. Two transcript variants encoding different isoforms have been found for this gene.
