= TBC1D10A =

Protein-coding gene in the species Homo sapiens

Identifiers
- Aliases: TBC1D10A, EPI64, TBC1D10, dJ130H16.1, dJ130H16.2, TBC1 domain family member 10A
- External IDs: OMIM: 610020; MGI: 2144164; GeneCards: TBC1D10A

Gene location (Human)
Chr.	Chromosome 22 (human)
Band	22q12.2	Start	30,291,990 bp
Band	22q12.2	End	30,326,947 bp

Gene location (Mouse)
Chr.	Chromosome 11 (mouse)
Band	11|11 A1	Start	4,136,789 bp
Band	11|11 A1	End	4,165,505 bp
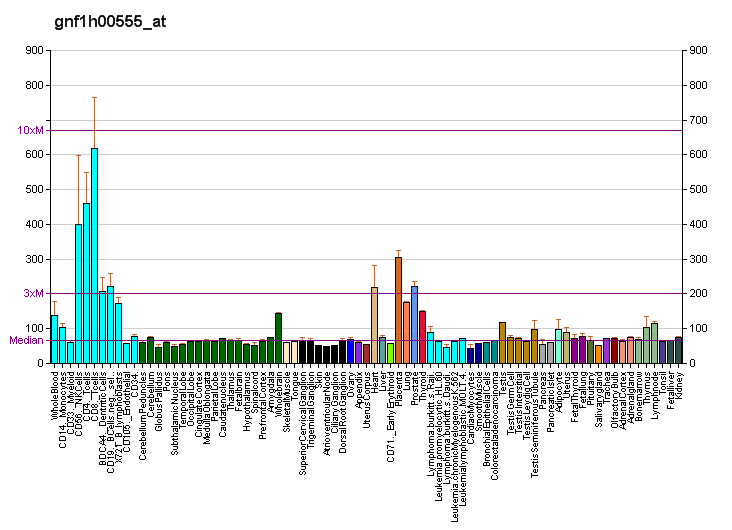
RNA expression pattern
Bgee	Human / Mouse (ortholog); Top expressed in: nasal epithelium; skin of arm; skin of leg; mucosa of esophagus; skin of abdomen; granulocyte; gingival epithelium; mucosa of transverse colon; ascending aorta; spleen / Top expressed in: lip; right kidney; gastrula; yolk sac; molar; spermatocyte; esophagus; proximal tubule; corneal stroma; spermatid; More reference expression data
BioGPS	More reference expression data
Gene ontology
Molecular function	PDZ domain binding; protein binding; guanyl-nucleotide exchange factor activity; GTPase activator activity; cadherin binding
Cellular component	microvillus; plasma membrane; cell projection; extracellular exosome; endomembrane system; cytosol; intracellular anatomical structure
Biological process	regulation of cilium assembly; activation of cysteine-type endopeptidase activity; retrograde transport, endosome to Golgi; positive regulation of proteolysis; activation of GTPase activity; regulation of vesicle fusion; intracellular protein transport
Sources:Amigo / QuickGO
Orthologs
Databases	NCBI: entry; OMA: entry
Species	Human	Mouse
Entrez	83874	103724
Ensembl	ENSG00000099992	ENSMUSG00000034412
UniProt	Q9BXI6	P58802
RefSeq (mRNA)	NM_031937; NM_001204240	NM_134023
RefSeq (protein)	NP_001191169; NP_114143; NP_001191169.1; NP_114143.1	NP_598784
Location (UCSC)	Chr 22: 30.29 – 30.33 Mb	Chr 11: 4.14 – 4.17 Mb
PubMed search
- Wikidata
View/Edit Human	View/Edit Mouse

TBC1 domain family member 10A is a protein that in humans is encoded by the TBC1D10A gene.
