= FAM227A =

Protein

Identifiers
- Aliases: FAM227A, family with sequence similarity 227 member A, FAM227a
- External IDs: MGI: 1922979; HomoloGene: 123434; GeneCards: FAM227A; OMA:FAM227A - orthologs

Gene location (Human)
Chr.	Chromosome 22 (human)
Band	22q13.1	Start	38,578,118 bp
Band	22q13.1	End	38,656,629 bp

Gene location (Mouse)
Chr.	Chromosome 15 (mouse)
Band	15|15 E1	Start	79,493,777 bp
Band	15|15 E1	End	79,543,157 bp
RNA expression pattern
Bgee	Human / Mouse (ortholog); Top expressed in: right uterine tube; testicle; right testis; left testis; olfactory zone of nasal mucosa; ventricular zone; pituitary gland; stromal cell of endometrium; anterior pituitary; gonad / Top expressed in: interventricular septum; seminiferous tubule; spermatid; neural layer of retina; spermatocyte; genital tubercle; granulocyte; visual cortex; superior frontal gyrus; ventricular zone; More reference expression data
BioGPS	n/a
Orthologs
Species	Human	Mouse
Entrez	646851	75729
Ensembl	ENSG00000184949	ENSMUSG00000042564
UniProt	F5H4B4	n/a
RefSeq (mRNA)	NM_001013647; NM_001291030; NM_001384270; NM_001384271	NM_029407
RefSeq (protein)	NP_001013669; NP_001277959	n/a
Location (UCSC)	Chr 22: 38.58 – 38.66 Mb	Chr 15: 79.49 – 79.54 Mb
PubMed search
- Wikidata
View/Edit Human	View/Edit Mouse

FAM227A is a protein that in humans is encoded by FAM227A gene. Current studies have determined the location of this gene to be in the nuclear region of the cell. FAM227A is most highly expressed in the tissues of the fallopian tube, testis, and pituitary gland. FAM227A is present in species of mammals, birds and reptiles, and gene alignment sequences have shown that FAM227A is a rapidly evolving gene.

== Gene ==
FAM227A is found on chromosome 22 at the location 22q13.1. It is flanked by the gene LOC105373031 on the left and CBY1 on the right. The gene is 78,510 base pairs long with 21 exons. There are currently no aliases for FAM227A.

== mRNA ==
There are two isoforms of FAM227A. The first isoform, NM_001013647.1, has a shorter transcript but a longer isoform. It is 2,948 base pairs long, and includes the first 17 exons. The second isoform, NM_001291030.1, is 10,362 base pairs long. It starts translation at a different start codon than variant 1 by utilizing an alternate splice site. The 5’ region is relatively short but the 3’ region is very long.

Conceptual Translation of FAM227A

== Protein ==
Visual representation of FAM227A. The brackets represent motifs, the grey diamonds represent predicted leucine-rich nuclear export signals, and the red diamonds represent predicted phosphorylation sites.

The primary sequence for FAM227A is isoform 1 with accession number: NP_001013669.1. It is 570 amino acids long. There are 9 isoforms. The molecular weight is 66kD, and the isoelectric point is 9.6. Compared to other proteins in humans, FAM227A has less abundant glycine and more abundant hydrophobic amino acids and positively charges amino acids. The protein is predicted to be in the nuclear region of the cell. Three nuclear signals include HKKK at 129(pat 4), KKK at 130(pat4), and PKKTKIK at 410(pat7). An FWWh region, where h signifies hydrophobic, runs from amino acids 135-296 in Homo sapiens. Most eukaryotic proteins contain this sequence. The function of this region is still unknown. Motifs in FAM227A include KRK, SGK, and RRE.

=== Secondary Structure ===
The secondary structure is predicted to be made up of alpha helices mainly. but also beta pleated sheets.

Secondary Structure Prediction

=== Post-Translational Modification ===
Phosphorylation is the only predicted post-translational modification. There are three experimentally determined phosphorylation sites at Y343, S348, and S349.

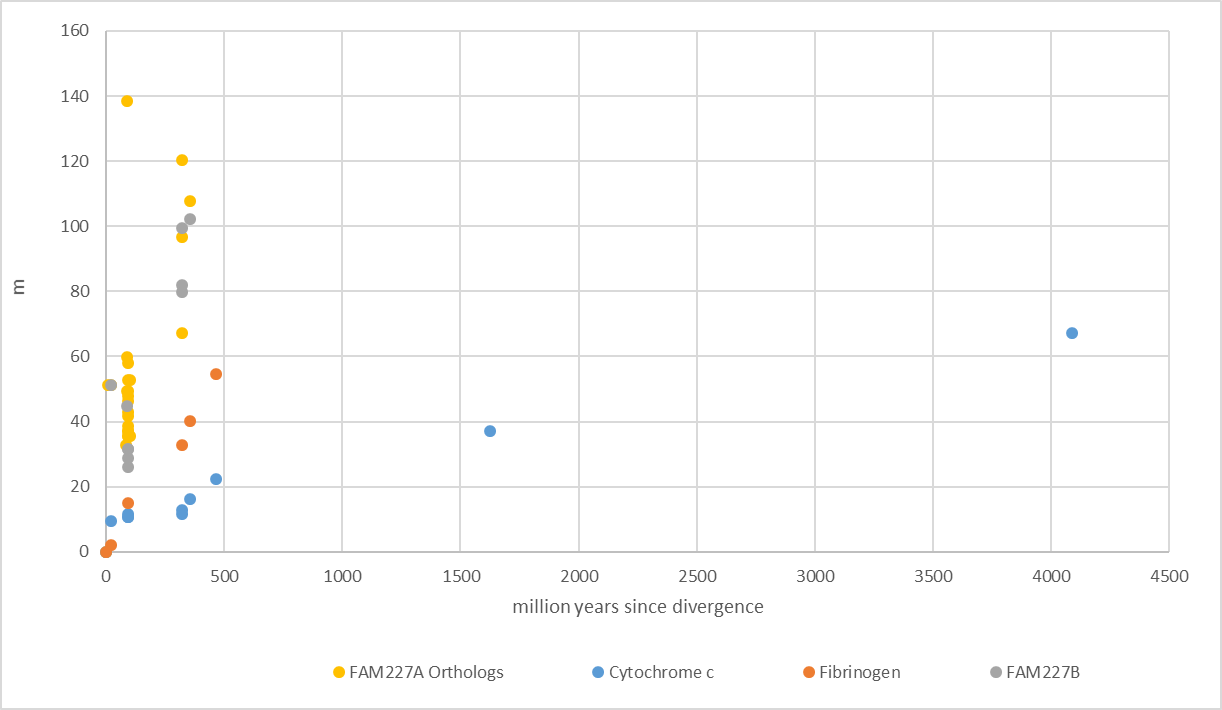
Evolutionary History of FAM227A. This gene appears to evolve rapidly when compared to cytochrom c and fibrinogen

=== Expression ===
FAM227A is experimentally determined to be highly expressed in the testis, epididymis, pituitary gland, and the fallopian tubes. This protein is not predicted to be ubiquitous as the rate of expression varies across tissue types.

=== Function ===
Currently, the function of FAM227A has not been characterized.

=== Interacting Proteins ===
Currently, there are no predicted proteins that interact with FAM227A

=== Subcellular Localization ===
FAM227A is predicted to be located in the nuclear region of the cell. This prediction is consistent across species.

	Nuclear	Mitochondrial	Cytoplasmic	Vacuolar	Extracellular
Homo Sapiens	43.5%	17.4%	17.4%	8.7%	4.3%
Nomascus leucogenys	39.1%	21.7%	17.4%	8.7%	8.7%
Marmota marmota	60.9%	N/A	26.1%	4.3%	N/A
Camelus bactrianus	52.2%	21.7%	8.7%	8.7%	8.7%
Thamnophis sirtalis	69.6%	8.7%	8.7%	N/A	N/A

== Homology ==
Paralogs: FAM227B

Orthologs: FAM227A is present mainly in mammals but also in species of reptiles and birds. The most distantly related ortholog is Xenopus tropicalis, the Western Clawed Frog. Based on the years of divergence for FAM227A, the gene evolved very rapidly.

Order	Genus and species	Common name	Date of Divergence	Accession #	Sequence Identity to humans
Primates	Homo sapiens	Human	0	NP_001013669.1	100%
Primates	Nomascus leucogenys	Northern White-Cheeked Gibbon	19.43	XP_003264802.1	96%
Scandentia	Tupaia chinensis	Chinese Tree Shrew	85	XP_006155440.1	72%
Rodentia	Jaculus jaculus	Lesser Egyptian Jerboa	88	XP_012804178.1	61%
Carnivora	Ailuropoda melanoleuca	Giant Panda	94	XP_002914627.1	70%
Perissodactyla	Equus asinus	Donkey	94	XP_014706772.1	69%
Cetartiodactyla	Oncinus orca	Killer Whale	94	XP_012392035.1	63%
Soricomorpha	Condylura cristata	Star-Nosed Mole	94	XP_012590687.1	62%
Chiroptera	Eptesicus fuscus	Big Brown Bat	94	XP_008143135.1	61%
Cingulata	Dasypus novemcinctus	Nine Banded Armadillo	102	XP_004447922.1	70%
Sirenia	Trichechus manadtrus latirostris	West Indian Manatee	102	XP_004374098.1	59%
Tinamiformes	Tinamus guttatus	White-Throated Tinamou	320	XP_010218404.1	51%
Testudines	Pelodiscus sinensis	Chinese Softshell Turtle	320	XP_006119021.1	38%
Anura	Xenopus tropicalis	Western Clawed Frog	353	XP_002933807.2	34%

== Clinical Significance ==
In 2016, a study performed an association analysis on chromosome 22 at 31203 markers in order to determine if high blood pressure and smoking were correlated. Chromosome 22 was chosen based on the results of the data collected from three clinical visits at the Framingham Heart Study. In 2013, researchers investigated 3 clusters of SNP's thought to be linked to prostate cancer in Arab populations. The study found that the deletion region on chromosome 22q13, where FAM227A is located, can also be linked to breast and colorectal cancer in humans in addition to prostate cancer3. Another study suggests the location of FAM227A may be linked to a central regulator, SOX10, which is involved in the maturation of neural crest derivatives. Gene deletion of FAM227A was linked to lung abnormality, atrial septum defect, small size for gestational age, and sensorineural hearing loss in this study.
