= CSDC2 =

Protein-coding gene in humans

Identifiers
- Aliases: CSDC2, PIPPIN, dJ347H13.2, cold shock domain containing C2
- External IDs: OMIM: 617689; MGI: 2146027; GeneCards: CSDC2

Gene location (Human)
Chr.	Chromosome 22 (human)
Band	22q13.2	Start	41,561,010 bp
Band	22q13.2	End	41,577,741 bp

Gene location (Mouse)
Chr.	Chromosome 15 (mouse)
Band	15|15 E1	Start	81,820,960 bp
Band	15|15 E1	End	81,835,142 bp
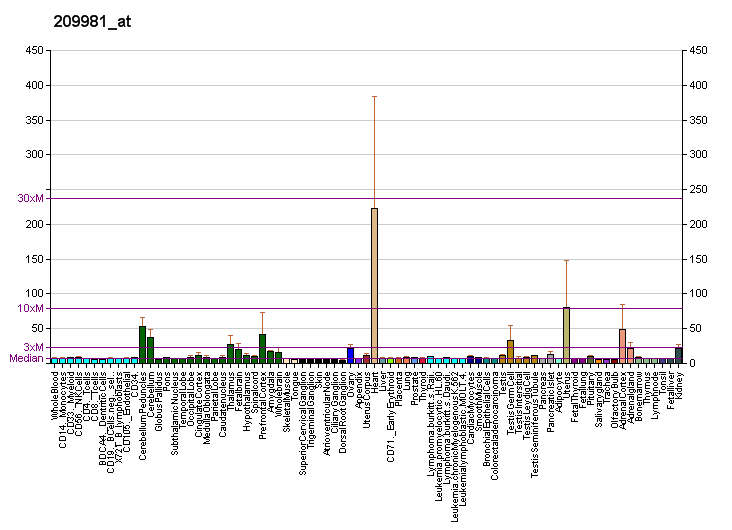
RNA expression pattern
Bgee	Human / Mouse (ortholog); Top expressed in: apex of heart; right auricle of heart; left ventricle; right coronary artery; left adrenal cortex; right adrenal gland; left ovary; right adrenal cortex; right ovary; popliteal artery / Top expressed in: pontine nuclei; medial geniculate nucleus; gastrula; medial vestibular nucleus; medial dorsal nucleus; dorsal tegmental nucleus; inferior colliculi; motor neuron; cerebellar cortex; cerebellar vermis; More reference expression data
BioGPS	More reference expression data
Gene ontology
Molecular function	DNA binding; protein binding; RNA binding; nucleic acid binding; mRNA 3'-UTR binding; transcription factor binding
Cellular component	nucleus; cytoplasm
Biological process	mRNA processing; regulation of transcription, DNA-templated; regulation of mRNA stability
Sources:Amigo / QuickGO
Orthologs
Databases	NCBI: entry; OMA: entry
Species	Human	Mouse
Entrez	27254	105859
Ensembl	ENSG00000172346	ENSMUSG00000042109
UniProt	Q9Y534	Q91YQ3
RefSeq (mRNA)	NM_014460	NM_145473
RefSeq (protein)	NP_055275	NP_663448
Location (UCSC)	Chr 22: 41.56 – 41.58 Mb	Chr 15: 81.82 – 81.84 Mb
PubMed search
- Wikidata
View/Edit Human	View/Edit Mouse

Cold shock domain-containing protein C2 is a protein that in humans is encoded by the CSDC2 gene.
