= DGCR5 =

Identifiers
- Aliases: DGCR5, LINC00037, NCRNA00037, DiGeorge syndrome critical region gene 5 (non-protein coding), DiGeorge syndrome critical region gene 5
- External IDs: OMIM: 618040; GeneCards: DGCR5

Gene location (Human)
Chr.	Chromosome 22 (human)
Band	22q11.21	Start	18,970,525 bp
Band	22q11.21	End	19,031,242 bp
RNA expression pattern
Bgee	Human / Mouse (ortholog); Top expressed in: right hemisphere of cerebellum; right frontal lobe; prefrontal cortex; Brodmann area 9; nucleus accumbens; cingulate gyrus; anterior cingulate cortex; amygdala; caudate nucleus; buccal mucosa cell / n/a; More reference expression data
BioGPS	n/a
Orthologs
Databases	NCBI: entry; OMA: entry
Species	Human	Mouse
Entrez	26220	n/a
Ensembl	ENSG00000273032	n/a
UniProt	n a	n/a
RefSeq (mRNA)	n/a	n/a
RefSeq (protein)	n/a	n/a
Location (UCSC)	Chr 22: 18.97 – 19.03 Mb	n/a
PubMed search		n/a
- Wikidata
View/Edit Human

In molecular biology, DiGeorge syndrome critical region gene 5 (non-protein coding), also known as DGCR5, is a long non-coding RNA. In humans, it is located on chromosome 22q11, at the ADU breakpoint associated with DiGeorge syndrome. Its expression is regulated by the transcription factor REST (RE1-Silencing Transcription factor).

== See also ==
- Long noncoding RNA
