= SAMM50 =

Protein-coding gene in the species Homo sapiens

Identifiers
- Aliases: SAMM50, OMP85, SAM50, TOB55, TRG-3, YNL026W, CGI-51, SAMM50 sorting and assembly machinery component
- External IDs: OMIM: 612058; MGI: 1915903; HomoloGene: 41034; GeneCards: SAMM50; OMA:SAMM50 - orthologs

Gene location (Human)
Chr.	Chromosome 22 (human)
Band	22q13.31	Start	43,955,442 bp
Band	22q13.31	End	44,010,531 bp

Gene location (Mouse)
Chr.	Chromosome 15 (mouse)
Band	15|15 E2	Start	84,076,442 bp
Band	15|15 E2	End	84,101,468 bp
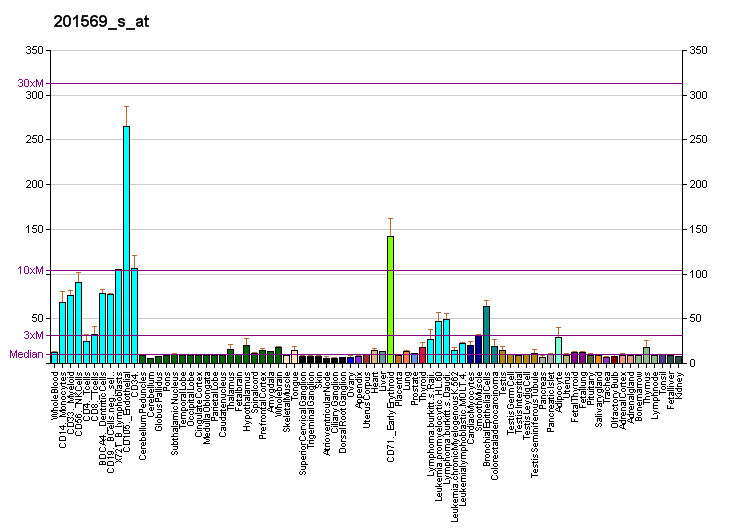

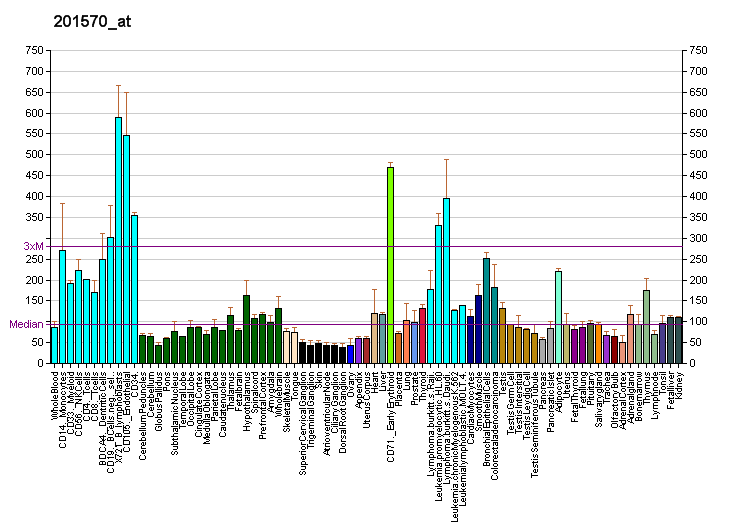
RNA expression pattern
Bgee	Human / Mouse (ortholog); Top expressed in: endothelial cell; vastus lateralis muscle; Skeletal muscle tissue of rectus abdominis; muscle of thigh; gastrocnemius muscle; thoracic diaphragm; triceps brachii muscle; body of tongue; Skeletal muscle tissue of biceps brachii; deltoid muscle / Top expressed in: Paneth cell; otic placode; saccule; medullary collecting duct; fossa; condyle; motor neuron; renal corpuscle; endocardial cushion; substantia nigra; More reference expression data
BioGPS	More reference expression data
Gene ontology
Molecular function	protein binding
Cellular component	cytoplasm; integral component of membrane; mitochondrial inner membrane; outer membrane; mitochondrial outer membrane; extracellular exosome; membrane; mitochondrion; SAM complex
Biological process	cristae formation; protein insertion into mitochondrial outer membrane; mitochondrial respiratory chain complex assembly
Sources:Amigo / QuickGO
Orthologs
Species	Human	Mouse
Entrez	25813	68653
Ensembl	ENSG00000100347	ENSMUSG00000022437
UniProt	Q9Y512	Q8BGH2
RefSeq (mRNA)	NM_015380	NM_178614
RefSeq (protein)	NP_056195	NP_848729
Location (UCSC)	Chr 22: 43.96 – 44.01 Mb	Chr 15: 84.08 – 84.1 Mb
PubMed search
- Wikidata
View/Edit Human	View/Edit Mouse

Sorting and assembly machinery component 50 homolog is a protein that in humans is encoded by the SAMM50 gene.

== Clinical significance ==
By means of exome sequencing, two variants - P377A and V231I on the SAMM50 gene were determined to have a potential relationship to the disease phenotype of Ezra, 9 year old male with Epilepsy, ESES, Hemiplegic Migraine, Exocrine Pancreatic Insuffiency, CSID, Global Apraxia, developmental regressions. History of torticollis, psychomotor regression, colitis as well as Carnitine Deficiency.
