= SHFM3P1 =

FBXW4P1

Identifiers
- Aliases: FBXW4P1, FBW3, FBXW3, SHFM3P1, F-box and WD repeat domain containing 4 pseudogene 1
- External IDs: GeneCards: FBXW4P1; OMA:FBXW4P1 - orthologs

Gene location (Human)
Chr.	Chromosome 22 (human)
Band	22q11.23	Start	23,262,767 bp
Band	22q11.23	End	23,265,005 bp
Orthologs
Species	Human	Mouse
Entrez	26226	n/a
Ensembl	ENSG00000230701	n/a
UniProt	n a	n/a
RefSeq (mRNA)	NM_012165	n/a
RefSeq (protein)	n/a	n/a
Location (UCSC)	Chr 22: 23.26 – 23.27 Mb	n/a
PubMed search		n/a
- Wikidata
View/Edit Human

Split hand/foot malformation (ectrodactyly) type 3 pseudogene 1, also known as SHFM3P1, is a human gene.
