= RTL6 =

Human protein

Identifiers
- Aliases: RTL6, Mar6, Mart6, dJ1033E15.2, LDOC1L, leucine zipper, down-regulated in cancer 1-like, leucine zipper, down-regulated in cancer 1 like, LDOC1 like, SIRH3, retrotransposon Gag like 6
- External IDs: MGI: 2675858; GeneCards: RTL6

Gene location (Human)
| Chr. | Chromosome 22 (human) |
| Band | 22q13.31 | Start | 44,492,583 bp |
| Band | 22q13.31 | End | 44,498,233 bp |

Gene location (Mouse)
| Chr. | Chromosome 15 (mouse) |
| Band | 15|15 E2 | Start | 84,437,599 bp |
| Band | 15|15 E2 | End | 84,442,024 bp |
RNA expression pattern
| Bgee | Human / Mouse (ortholog); Top expressed in: endothelial cell; tibialis anterior muscle; mucosa of ileum; pancreatic epithelial cell; myocardium of left ventricle; ganglionic eminence; pancreatic ductal cell; cardiac muscle tissue of right atrium; middle temporal gyrus; ventricular zone / Top expressed in: saccule; otic vesicle; perirhinal cortex; entorhinal cortex; ganglionic eminence; CA3 field; medial ganglionic eminence; habenula; visual cortex; olfactory epithelium; More reference expression data |
| BioGPS | n/a |
Orthologs
| Databases | NCBI: entry; OMA: entry |
| Species | Human | Mouse |
| Entrez | 84247 | 223732 |
| Ensembl | ENSG00000188636 | ENSMUSG00000055745 |
| UniProt | Q6ICC9 | Q505G4 |
| RefSeq (mRNA) | NM_032287 | NM_177630 |
| RefSeq (protein) | NP_115663 | NP_808298 |
| Location (UCSC) | Chr 22: 44.49 – 44.5 Mb | Chr 15: 84.44 – 84.44 Mb |
| PubMed search |
- Wikidata
| View/Edit Human | View/Edit Mouse |

Retrotransposon Gag Like 6 is a protein encoded by the RTL6 gene in humans. RTL6 is a member of the Mart family of genes, which are related to Sushi-like retrotransposons and were derived from fish and amphibians. The RTL6 protein is localized to the nucleus and has a predicted leucine zipper motif that is known to bind nucleic acids in similar proteins, such as LDOC1.

== Gene ==
=== Locus ===
Gene neighborhood of RTL6 on chromosome 22.

The gene is on Chromosome 22 (human) at 22q13.31 on the minus strand from 44492570 to 44498125 nt on the GRCh38.p7 assembly of the human genome. Aliases for the gene include LDOC1L, MAR6, MART6, and SIRH3. RTL6 is made up of 2 exons and is encoded by 5556 base pairs of DNA .

=== Origin ===
RTL6 is a retrotransposon GAG related gene. It is one of eleven MART (Mammalian Retrotransposon Derived) genes in humans related to Sushi-like retrotransposons with long terminal repeats from fish and amphibians. Between 170 and 310 MYA, MART genes lost their ability to retrotranspose and concomitantly gained new, beneficial function for its host organism.

== mRNA ==
RTL6 has an alternate start of transcription 140 base pairs upstream of the normal transcribed region. The lengths of the primary mRNA and that with the upstream start of transcription are 5355 and 5495 base pairs respectively.

== Protein ==
=== Primary information ===
The primary amino acid sequence for RTL6 is made up of 239 residues. There are no known alternative splice variants of the protein. The molecular weight of the protein is 26.2 kDa and the isoelectric point is 11.58. RTL6 is a proline and arginine rich protein.

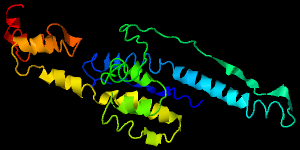
I-TASSER predicted secondary and tertiary structures for the RTL6 protein. Immunohistochemical staining of human stomach shows strong nuclear and cytoplasmic positivity in glandular cells.

=== Domains and motifs ===
RTL6 contains a predicted leucine zipper motif known to participate in nucleic acid binding in other proteins. RTL6 also contains a domain of unknown function from amino acid residues 98-177 . RTL6 is one of a number of genes belonging to the DUF4939 (domain of unknown function) superfamily.

=== Secondary structure ===
The secondary structure of RTL6 is made up of largely alpha helices. One region of RTL6 is also predicted to participate in a coiled-coil structure from amino acid residues 29–63.

=== Post-translational modifications ===
There are also two predicted phosphorylation sites for Protein Kinase C with high confidence scores at amino acid residues 6 and 45. There is also a predicted ubiquitination site with medium-confidence at amino acid residue 8.

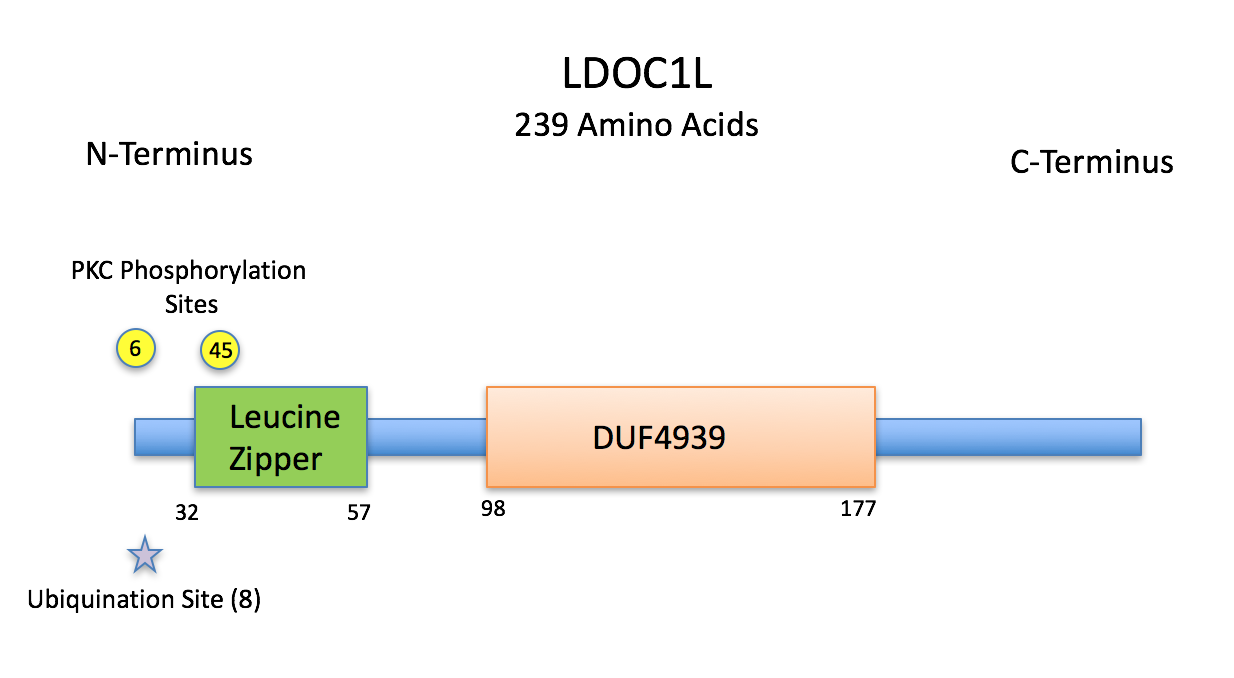
An annotated schematic of the RTL6 protein showing motifs and predicted phosphorylation and ubiquitination sites.

=== Cellular sublocation ===
RTL6 is expected to be localized to the nucleus and cytosol based on the presence of a leucine zipper domain, the absence of signals indicating secretion or transmembrane domains, and immunohistochemical staining.

== Expression ==
RTL6 has been shown to be expressed at high levels during all stages of development and in a wide variety of tissues.

RTL6 expression has been shown to fall in HeLa cervical cancer cells upon treatment with chemotherapeutic Casiopeinas and in A549 lung cancer cells upon treatment with Actinomycin D.

== Interacting proteins ==
RTL6 has been shown to interact with the following proteins:

| DDIT3 | DNA damage-inducible transcript 3 protein |
| NXF1 | Nuclear RNA export factor 1 |
| STX18 | Syntaxin 18 |
| MAFF | MAF bZIP transcription factor F |
| GOPC | Golgi-associated PDZ and coiled-coil motif-containing protein |
| BATF3 | Basic leucine zipper transcriptional factor ATF-like 3 |
| TERF2 | Telomeric repeat-binding factor 2 |
| UXAC | Uronate isomerase (Yersinia pestis) |

== Clinical significance ==
The RTL6 protein has been shown to interact with the UXAC protein from Yersinia pestis, the gram-negative bacterium responsible for the bubonic plague.

== Homology/evolution ==
=== Paralogs ===
Eleven paralogs were identified for RTL6 in humans. The paralogs have diverse functions and expression patterns, although many are known to have zinc finger domains and bind nucleic acids:

| MART Family Name | Accession number | Sequence length | Query Cover | Percent Similarity |
|---|---|---|---|---|
| RTL1 | NP_001128360.1 | 1358 | 100 | 7.6 |
| PEG10 (RTL2) | NP_055883.2 | 359 | 35 | 35 |
| RTL3 | NP_689907.1 | 2648 | 100 | 2.2 |
| RTL4 | NP_001004308.2 | 310 | 100 | 19 |
| RTL5 | NP_001019626.1 | 569 | 37 | 53 |
| RTL6 | NP_115663.2 | 239 | NA | NA |
| LDOC1 (RTL7) | NP_036449.1 | 146 | 33 | 41 |
| RTL8A | NP_001071640.1 | 113 | 33 | 44 |
| RTL8B | NP_001071641.1 | 113 | 33 | 43 |
| RTL8C | NP_001071639.1 | 113 | 33 | 44 |
| RTL9 | NP_065820.1 | 1388 | 22 | 39 |
| RTL10 | NP_078903.3 | 364 | 34 | 35 |

=== Orthologs ===
RTL6 is highly conserved across mammals, including the leucine zipper motif and DUF4939. The gene is also conserved in marsupials such as the opossum but not in birds such as the chicken, suggesting the gene was likely formed after the divergence of mammals and birds but before the divergence of marsupials and mammals (170-310 MYA:

| Organism | Common name | Classification | Accession number | Percent identity | Query Cover | Percent Similarity |
|---|---|---|---|---|---|---|
| Homo sapiens | Humans | Primate | NP_115663.2 | NA | NA | NA |
| Macaca mulatta | Rhesus Monkey | Primate | NP_001181372.1 | 98 | 100 | 99 |
| Felis catus | House Cat | Carnivore | XP_003989415.1 | 97 | 100 | 98 |
| Mus muscalus | Common Mouse | Rodent | NP_808298.2 | 92 | 100 | 96 |
| Pteropus alecto | Black Flying Fox | Bat | XP_006917396.1 | 96 | 100 | 98 |
| Equus caballus | Horse | Odd-Toed Ungulates | XP_005606827.1 | 95 | 100 | 98 |
| Bos Taurus | Cattle | Even-Toed Ungulates | XP_015326927.1 | 94 | 100 | 97 |
| Orcinus orca | Killer Whale | Whales/Dolphins | XP_004279624.1 | 95 | 100 | 98 |
| Trichechus manatus latirostirs | Florida Manatee | Placentals | XP_004380056.1 | 95 | 100 | 96 |
| Erinaceus europaeus | European Hedgehog | Rabbits/Hares | XP_016043235.1 | 93 | 100 | 96 |
| Ochotona princeps | American Pika | Insectivoires | XP_004589491.1 | 92 | 100 | 97 |

The most distantly detectable organisms with homology in the gene are bony fishes including salmon and the common carp, but similarity to the human protein sequence is markedly less than that of mammals. No traces of the gene can be seen in intermediates between mammals and bony fishes such as reptiles or amphibians:

| Organism | Common name | Classification | Accession number | Percent identity | Query Cover | Percent Similarity |
|---|---|---|---|---|---|---|
| Homo sapiens | Humans | Primate | NP_115663.2 | 100 | 100 | 100 |
| Cyprinus carpio | Common Carp | Bony Fishes | XP_018946777 | 30 | 41 | 34 |
| Esox lucius | Northern Pike | Bony Fishes | XP_019899574.1 | 31 | 55 | 31 |
| Nothobranchius furzeri | Black Rockcod | Bony Fishes | XP_010767110 | 37 | 35 | 39 |
