= WNT7B =

Protein-coding gene in humans

Identifiers
- Aliases: WNT7B, Wnt family member 7B
- External IDs: OMIM: 601967; MGI: 98962; GeneCards: WNT7B

Gene location (Human)
Chr.	Chromosome 22 (human)
Band	22q13.31	Start	45,920,366 bp
Band	22q13.31	End	45,977,162 bp

Gene location (Mouse)
Chr.	Chromosome 15 (mouse)
Band	15 E2|15 40.39 cM	Start	85,419,638 bp
Band	15 E2|15 40.39 cM	End	85,466,674 bp
RNA expression pattern
Bgee	Human / Mouse (ortholog); Top expressed in: vena cava; buccal mucosa cell; olfactory zone of nasal mucosa; mucosa of pharynx; skin of abdomen; nipple; skin of leg; renal medulla; mucosa of esophagus; amygdala / Top expressed in: epithelium of male urethra; epithelium of lens; esophagus; lumbar subsegment of spinal cord; set of lens fibers; medullary collecting duct; subiculum; ganglionic eminence; transitional epithelium of urinary bladder; dentate gyrus of hippocampal formation granule cell; More reference expression data
BioGPS	n/a
Gene ontology
Molecular function	frizzled binding; signaling receptor binding; receptor ligand activity
Cellular component	endocytic vesicle membrane; endoplasmic reticulum lumen; extracellular region; Golgi lumen; extracellular exosome; plasma membrane; cytoplasm; extracellular space
Biological process	cellular response to retinoic acid; cell fate commitment; renal inner medulla development; lung morphogenesis; mammary gland epithelium development; stem cell proliferation; embryonic organ development; lung development; renal outer medulla development; embryonic placenta morphogenesis; synapse organization; metanephric epithelium development; in utero embryonic development; trachea cartilage morphogenesis; chorio-allantoic fusion; multicellular organism development; developmental growth involved in morphogenesis; forebrain regionalization; positive regulation of osteoblast differentiation; cell metabolism; metanephric loop of Henle development; neuron differentiation; central nervous system vasculogenesis; fibroblast proliferation; lobar bronchus development; metanephros morphogenesis; inner medullary collecting duct development; metanephric collecting duct development; establishment or maintenance of polarity of embryonic epithelium; lung epithelium development; outer medullary collecting duct development; oxygen homeostasis; lens fiber cell development; homeostatic process; regulation of cell projection size; response to glucocorticoid; neuron projection morphogenesis; Wnt signaling pathway; neuron projection development; positive regulation of JNK cascade; canonical Wnt signaling pathway; regulation of signaling receptor activity
Sources:Amigo / QuickGO
Orthologs
Databases	NCBI: entry; OMA: entry
Species	Human	Mouse
Entrez	7477	22422
Ensembl	ENSG00000188064	ENSMUSG00000022382
UniProt	P56706	P28047
RefSeq (mRNA)	NM_058238	NM_001163633; NM_001163634; NM_009528
RefSeq (protein)	NP_478679	NP_001157105; NP_001157106; NP_033554
Location (UCSC)	Chr 22: 45.92 – 45.98 Mb	Chr 15: 85.42 – 85.47 Mb
PubMed search
- Wikidata
View/Edit Human	View/Edit Mouse

Protein Wnt-7b is a protein that in humans is encoded by the WNT7B gene.

Wnt7b is a signaling protein that plays a crucial role for many developmental processes including placental, lung, eye, dendrite, and bone formation along with kidney development. The primary role of Wnt7b is to establish the cortico-medullary axis of epithelial organization.

== Function ==
The WNT gene family consists of structurally related genes that encode secreted signaling proteins. These proteins have been implicated in oncogenesis and in several developmental processes, including regulation of cell fate and patterning during embryogenesis. This gene is a member of the WNT gene family. It encodes a protein showing 99% and 91% amino acid identity to the mouse and Xenopus Wnt7A proteins, respectively. Among members of the human WNT family, this protein is most similar to WNT7A protein (77.1% total amino acid identity). This gene may play important roles in the development and progression of gastric cancer, esophageal cancer, and pancreatic cancer.

== Role in kidney ==
Wnt7b is a key paracrine signaling factor secreted by the ureteric epithelium that establishes the cortico-medullary axis of the mammalian kidney. Wnt7b is a signaling protein that plays a crucial role for many developmental processes including placental, lung, eye, dendrite, and bone formation along with kidney development. The primary role of Wnt7b is to establish the cortico-medullary axis of epithelial organization. The establishment of the cortico-medullary axis plays an essential role for the development of the medullary component of the kidney. Wnt7b regulates orientation of cell divisions in renal medullary collecting duct epithelium, in which is the major structure driving renal medulla formation. There are two interstitial regulators that are explicitly linked to medullary development; Pod1 which encodes a transcription factor expressed in the renal interstitium while p57Kip2 encodes a cyclin-dependent kinase inhibitor which is linked to Beckwith-Wiedemann syndrome. Pod1, p57Kip2 and integrin α3 (ITGA3) are three factors that are involved in renal medullary morphogenesis. The knockout of Pod1 results in no renal medullary formation while p57Kip2 and Itga3 knockouts resulted in a reduced renal medulla. Removal of Wnt7b activity leads to a failure of medullary development while other aspects of kidney development including ureteric branching, development of the renal cortex, and nephrogenesis are unaffected. The absence of renal medulla also affects the plane of epithelial cell division along with little proliferative growth of the loop of Henle. Wnt7b null allele will result in fatality due to the diminution of placental function leading to the failure to initiate organogenesis.
