= DGCR6 =

Protein-coding gene in the species Homo sapiens

Identifiers
- Aliases: DGCR6, DiGeorge syndrome critical region gene 6
- External IDs: OMIM: 601279; HomoloGene: 136000; GeneCards: DGCR6; OMA:DGCR6 - orthologs

Gene location (Human)
Chr.	Chromosome 22 (human)
Band	22q11.21|22q11	Start	18,906,028 bp
Band	22q11.21|22q11	End	18,914,238 bp
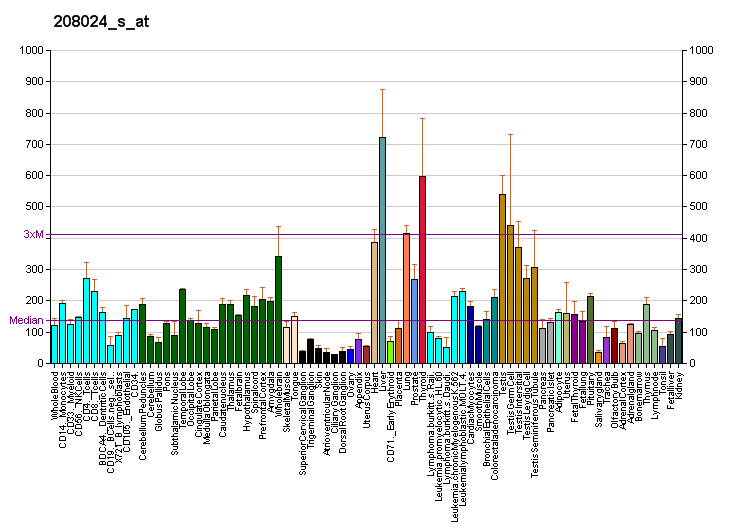
RNA expression pattern
Bgee	Human / Mouse (ortholog); Top expressed in: skeletal muscle tissue; muscle of thigh; gastrocnemius muscle; right hemisphere of cerebellum; right frontal lobe; hypothalamus; anterior cingulate cortex; amygdala; hippocampus proper; nucleus accumbens / n/a; More reference expression data
BioGPS	More reference expression data
Gene ontology
Molecular function	molecular function
Cellular component	nucleus; extracellular matrix
Biological process	animal organ morphogenesis; cell adhesion
Sources:Amigo / QuickGO
Orthologs
Species	Human	Mouse
Entrez	8214	n/a
Ensembl	ENSG00000183628	n/a
UniProt	Q14129; Q6FGH4	n/a
RefSeq (mRNA)	NM_005675	n/a
RefSeq (protein)	NP_001355171	n/a
Location (UCSC)	Chr 22: 18.91 – 18.91 Mb	n/a
PubMed search		n/a
- Wikidata
View/Edit Human

Protein DGCR6 is a protein that in humans is encoded by the DGCR6 gene.

DiGeorge syndrome, and more widely, the CATCH 22 syndrome, are associated with microdeletions in chromosomal region 22q11.2. This gene product shares homology with the Drosophila melanogaster gonadal protein, which participates in gonadal and germ cell development, and with the human laminin gamma-1 chain, which upon polymerization with alpha- and beta-chains forms the laminin molecule. Laminin binds to cells through interaction with a receptor and has functions in cell attachment, migration, and tissue organization during development. This gene could be a candidate for involvement in the DiGeorge syndrome pathology by playing a role in neural crest cell migration into the third and fourth pharyngeal pouches, the structures from which derive the organs affected in DiGeorge syndrome.
