= TRMU =

Protein-coding gene in the species Homo sapiens

Identifiers
- Aliases: TRMU, MTO2, MTU1, TRMT, TRMT1, TRNT1, LCAL3, tRNA 5-methylaminomethyl-2-thiouridylate methyltransferase, tRNA mitochondrial 2-thiouridylase
- External IDs: OMIM: 610230; MGI: 1919276; HomoloGene: 5589; GeneCards: TRMU; OMA:TRMU - orthologs

Gene location (Human)
Chr.	Chromosome 22 (human)
Band	22q13.31	Start	46,330,875 bp
Band	22q13.31	End	46,357,340 bp

Gene location (Mouse)
Chr.	Chromosome 15 (mouse)
Band	15|15 E2	Start	85,763,513 bp
Band	15|15 E2	End	85,781,595 bp
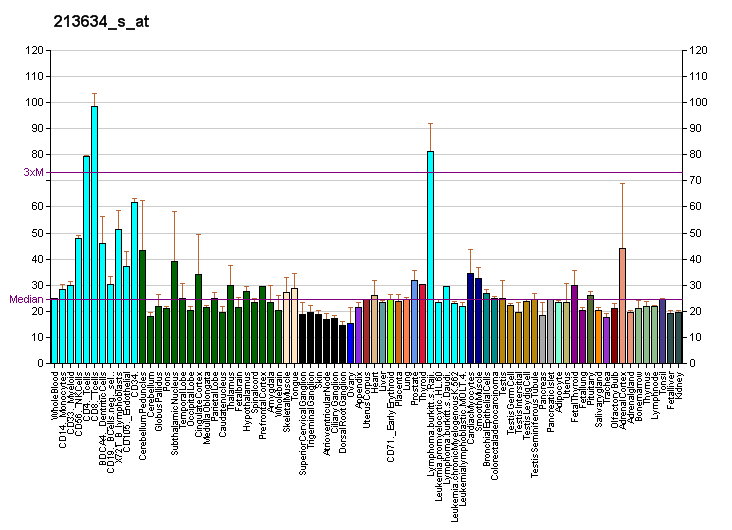
RNA expression pattern
Bgee	Human / Mouse (ortholog); Top expressed in: apex of heart; right hemisphere of cerebellum; right uterine tube; anterior pituitary; right auricle of heart; right lobe of thyroid gland; body of pancreas; ventricular zone; left ovary; right ovary / Top expressed in: neural layer of retina; right kidney; interventricular septum; proximal tubule; otolith organ; neural tube; lens; utricle; ventricular zone; lumbar subsegment of spinal cord; More reference expression data
BioGPS	More reference expression data
Gene ontology
Molecular function	RNA binding; transferase activity; tRNA binding; nucleotide binding; sulfurtransferase activity; ATP binding; methyltransferase activity
Cellular component	mitochondrion; nucleoplasm
Biological process	tRNA wobble position uridine thiolation; mitochondrial tRNA thio-modification; tRNA processing; methylation
Sources:Amigo / QuickGO
Orthologs
Species	Human	Mouse
Entrez	55687	72026
Ensembl	ENSG00000100416	ENSMUSG00000022386
UniProt	O75648; Q2PPL5	Q9DAT5
RefSeq (mRNA)	NM_001008569; NM_001008571; NM_001282782; NM_001282783; NM_001282784 NM_001282785; NM_018006	NM_028063
RefSeq (protein)	NP_001269711; NP_001269712; NP_001269713; NP_001269714; NP_060476 NP_001269711.1	NP_082339
Location (UCSC)	Chr 22: 46.33 – 46.36 Mb	Chr 15: 85.76 – 85.78 Mb
PubMed search
- Wikidata
View/Edit Human	View/Edit Mouse

Mitochondrial tRNA-specific 2-thiouridylase 1 is an enzyme that in humans is encoded by the TRMU gene.

This gene is a member of the trmU family. It encodes a mitochondria-specific tRNA-modifying enzyme that is required for the 2-thio modification of 5-taurinomethyl-2-thiouridine tRNA-Lys on the wobble position of the anticodon.
