= IFT27 =

Protein-coding gene in the species Homo sapiens

Identifiers
- Aliases: IFT27, BBS19, RABL4, RAYL, intraflagellar transport 27, FAP156
- External IDs: OMIM: 615870; MGI: 1914292; GeneCards: IFT27

Gene location (Human)
| Chr. | Chromosome 22 (human) |
| Band | 22q12.3 | Start | 36,758,202 bp |
| Band | 22q12.3 | End | 36,776,256 bp |

Gene location (Mouse)
| Chr. | Chromosome 15 (mouse) |
| Band | 15|15 E1 | Start | 78,043,663 bp |
| Band | 15|15 E1 | End | 78,058,307 bp |
RNA expression pattern
| Bgee | Human / Mouse (ortholog); Top expressed in: right uterine tube; epithelium of bronchus; bronchial epithelial cell; olfactory zone of nasal mucosa; anterior pituitary; caudate nucleus; nucleus accumbens; C1 segment; right lobe of thyroid gland; right adrenal gland / Top expressed in: Rostral migratory stream; internal carotid artery; external carotid artery; epithelium of lens; medial ganglionic eminence; Epithelium of choroid plexus; facial motor nucleus; condyle; fossa; maxillary prominence; More reference expression data |
| BioGPS | n/a |
Gene ontology
| Molecular function | nucleotide binding; GTP binding; protein binding; GTPase activity |
| Cellular component | cell projection; motile cilium; sperm principal piece; sperm midpiece; ciliary tip; centrosome; intraciliary transport particle B; endosome; Golgi apparatus; cilium; cytoplasm; sperm flagellum; membrane; intracellular anatomical structure |
| Biological process | smoothened signaling pathway; protein transport; intracellular protein transport; intraciliary transport; cochlea development; inner ear receptor cell stereocilium organization; intraciliary transport involved in cilium assembly; kidney development; spermatogenesis; Rab protein signal transduction; cell differentiation; signal transduction; small GTPase mediated signal transduction |
Sources:Amigo / QuickGO
Orthologs
| Databases | NCBI: entry; OMA: entry |
| Species | Human | Mouse |
| Entrez | 11020 | 67042 |
| Ensembl | ENSG00000100360 | ENSMUSG00000016637 |
| UniProt | Q9BW83 | Q9D0P8 |
| RefSeq (mRNA) | NM_001177701; NM_001177702; NM_006860; NM_001363003 | NM_025931 |
| RefSeq (protein) | NP_001171172; NP_006851; NP_001349932 | NP_080207 |
| Location (UCSC) | Chr 22: 36.76 – 36.78 Mb | Chr 15: 78.04 – 78.06 Mb |
| PubMed search |
- Wikidata
| View/Edit Human | View/Edit Mouse |

Intraflagellar transport 27 is a protein that in humans is encoded by the IFT27 gene.

== Function ==
This gene encodes a GTP-binding protein that is a core component of the intraflagellar transport complex B. Characterization of the similar Chlamydomonas protein indicates a function in cell cycle control. Alternative splicing of this gene results in multiple transcript variants. [provided by RefSeq, Jan 2012].
