= THAP7 =

Protein-coding gene in the species Homo sapiens

Identifiers
- Aliases: THAP7, THAP domain containing 7
- External IDs: OMIM: 609518; MGI: 1916259; GeneCards: THAP7

Gene location (Human)
Chr.	Chromosome 22 (human)
Band	22q11.21	Start	20,999,104 bp
Band	22q11.21	End	21,002,196 bp

Gene location (Mouse)
Chr.	Chromosome 16 (mouse)
Band	16 A3|16	Start	17,345,846 bp
Band	16 A3|16	End	17,349,000 bp
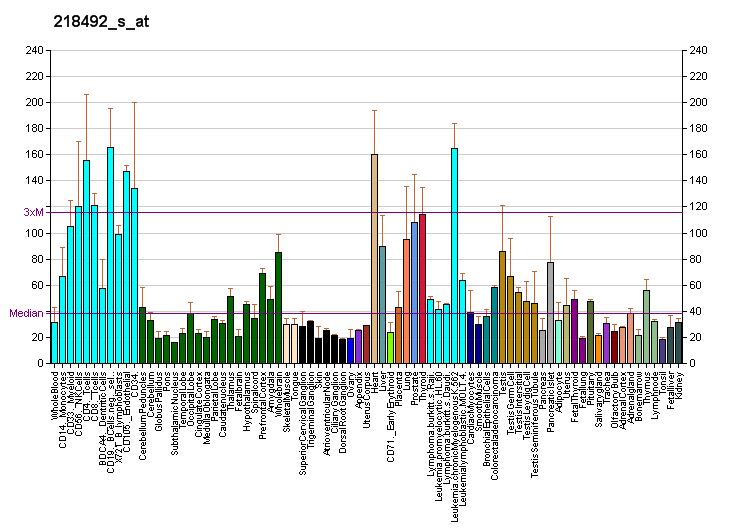
RNA expression pattern
Bgee	Human / Mouse (ortholog); Top expressed in: anterior pituitary; right testis; muscle of thigh; left testis; apex of heart; gastric mucosa; gastrocnemius muscle; left uterine tube; right lobe of liver; gonad / Top expressed in: fossa; internal carotid artery; primary oocyte; external carotid artery; motor neuron; condyle; spermatocyte; proximal tubule; right kidney; spermatid; More reference expression data
BioGPS	More reference expression data
Gene ontology
Molecular function	DNA binding; C2H2 zinc finger domain binding; protein binding; metal ion binding; protein N-terminus binding; nucleic acid binding; identical protein binding; DNA-binding transcription factor activity, RNA polymerase II-specific
Cellular component	nuclear speck; chromosome; nucleus; nuclear membrane; intracellular membrane-bounded organelle
Biological process	negative regulation of transcription, DNA-templated; regulation of transcription, DNA-templated; transcription, DNA-templated; regulation of transcription by RNA polymerase II
Sources:Amigo / QuickGO
Orthologs
Databases	NCBI: entry; OMA: entry
Species	Human	Mouse
Entrez	80764	69009
Ensembl	ENSG00000184436	ENSMUSG00000022760
UniProt	Q9BT49	Q8VCZ3
RefSeq (mRNA)	NM_030573; NM_001008695; NM_001008696	NM_026909
RefSeq (protein)	NP_001008695; NP_085050	NP_081185
Location (UCSC)	Chr 22: 21 – 21 Mb	Chr 16: 17.35 – 17.35 Mb
PubMed search
- Wikidata
View/Edit Human	View/Edit Mouse

THAP domain-containing protein 7 is a protein that in humans is encoded by the THAP7 gene.
