= SULT4A1 =

Protein-coding gene in the species Homo sapiens

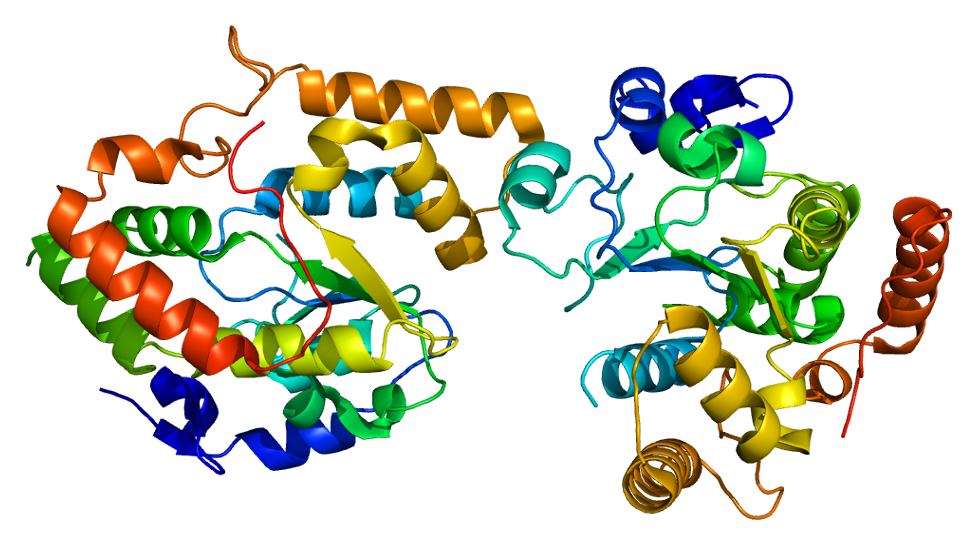

Identifiers
- Aliases: SULT4A1, BR-STL-1, BRSTL1, DJ388M5.3, NST, SULTX3, hBR-STL-1, sulfotransferase family 4A member 1
- External IDs: OMIM: 608359; MGI: 1888971; GeneCards: SULT4A1
Available structures
PDB	Ortholog search: PDBe RCSB
PDB	List of PDB id codes 1ZD1

Gene location (Human)
Chr.	Chromosome 22 (human)
Band	22q13.31	Start	43,824,509 bp
Band	22q13.31	End	43,862,513 bp

Gene location (Mouse)
Chr.	Chromosome 15 (mouse)
Band	15|15 E2	Start	83,960,298 bp
Band	15|15 E2	End	83,989,955 bp
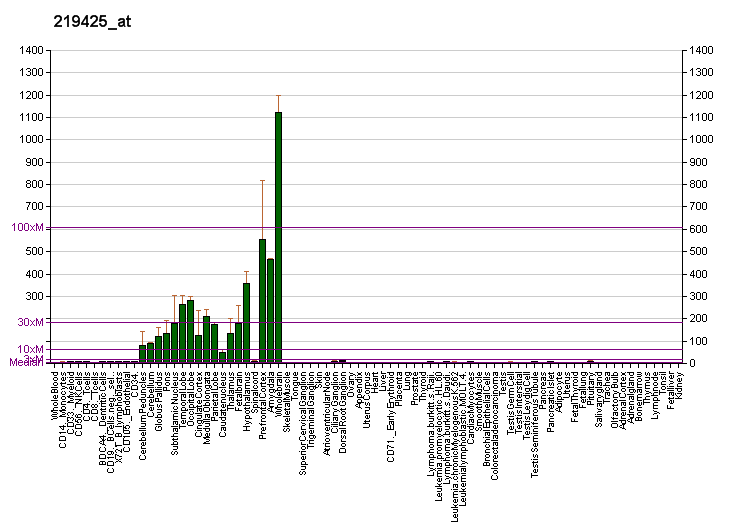
RNA expression pattern
Bgee	Human / Mouse (ortholog); Top expressed in: right frontal lobe; prefrontal cortex; Brodmann area 9; middle temporal gyrus; Brodmann area 10; right hemisphere of cerebellum; primary visual cortex; cingulate gyrus; anterior cingulate cortex; frontal pole / Top expressed in: medial dorsal nucleus; medial vestibular nucleus; superior frontal gyrus; medial geniculate nucleus; lateral geniculate nucleus; primary visual cortex; dentate gyrus of hippocampal formation granule cell; deep cerebellar nuclei; pontine nuclei; primary motor cortex; More reference expression data
BioGPS	More reference expression data
Gene ontology
Molecular function	transferase activity; sulfotransferase activity; protein binding; aryl sulfotransferase activity; identical protein binding
Cellular component	cytoplasm; cytosol
Biological process	sulfur compound metabolic process; steroid metabolic process; 3'-phosphoadenosine 5'-phosphosulfate metabolic process; lipid metabolism; biological process
Sources:Amigo / QuickGO
Orthologs
Databases	NCBI: entry; OMA: entry
Species	Human	Mouse
Entrez	25830	29859
Ensembl	ENSG00000130540	ENSMUSG00000018865
UniProt	Q9BR01	P63046
RefSeq (mRNA)	NM_014351; NM_176874	NM_013873; NM_001356515
RefSeq (protein)	NP_055166	NP_038901; NP_001343444
Location (UCSC)	Chr 22: 43.82 – 43.86 Mb	Chr 15: 83.96 – 83.99 Mb
PubMed search
- Wikidata
View/Edit Human	View/Edit Mouse

Sulfotransferase 4A1 is an enzyme that in humans is encoded by the SULT4A1 gene.

This gene encodes a member of the sulfotransferase family. The encoded protein is a brain-specific sulfotransferase believed to be involved in the metabolism of neurotransmitters. Polymorphisms in this gene may be associated with susceptibility to schizophrenia.
