= MIRLET7BHG =

Identifiers
- Aliases: MIRLET7BHG, linc-Ppara, MIRLET7B host gene
- External IDs: OMIM: 618216; GeneCards: MIRLET7BHG

Gene location (Human)
Chr.	Chromosome 22 (human)
Band	22q13.31	Start	46,053,869 bp
Band	22q13.31	End	46,113,928 bp
RNA expression pattern
Bgee	Human / Mouse (ortholog); Top expressed in: sural nerve; skin of arm; skin of abdomen; buccal mucosa cell; epithelium of colon; skin of leg; corpus callosum; cerebellar vermis; cervix; ascending aorta / n/a; More reference expression data
BioGPS	n/a
Orthologs
Databases	NCBI: entry; OMA: entry
Species	Human	Mouse
Entrez	400931	n/a
Ensembl	ENSG00000197182	n/a
UniProt	n a	n/a
RefSeq (mRNA)	NM_207477	n/a
RefSeq (protein)	n/a	n/a
Location (UCSC)	Chr 22: 46.05 – 46.11 Mb	n/a
PubMed search		n/a
- Wikidata
View/Edit Human

MIRLET7B host gene (non-protein coding) is a protein in humans that is encoded by the MIRLET7BHG gene.
