= KIAA0930 =

Protein-coding gene in the species Homo sapiens

Identifiers
- Aliases: KIAA0930, C22orf9, LSC3
- External IDs: MGI: 2444899; HomoloGene: 15140; GeneCards: KIAA0930; OMA:KIAA0930 - orthologs

Gene location (Human)
Chr.	Chromosome 22 (human)
Band	22q13.31	Start	45,192,244 bp
Band	22q13.31	End	45,240,894 bp

Gene location (Mouse)
Chr.	Chromosome 15 (mouse)
Band	15|15 E2	Start	84,828,137 bp
Band	15|15 E2	End	84,872,752 bp
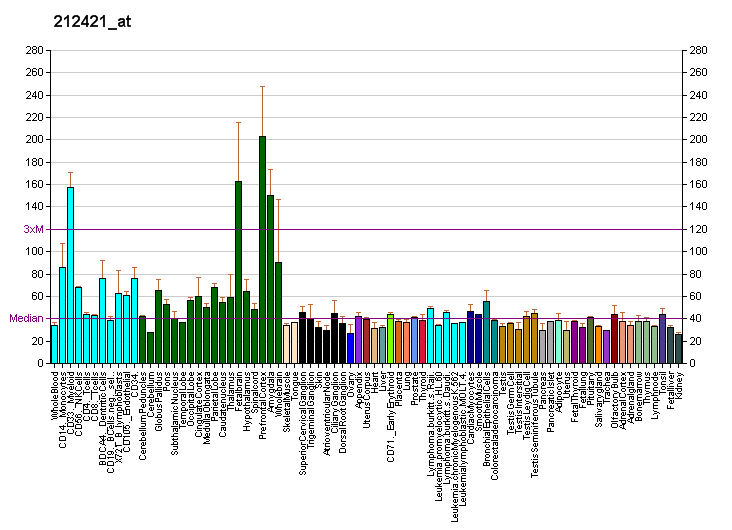

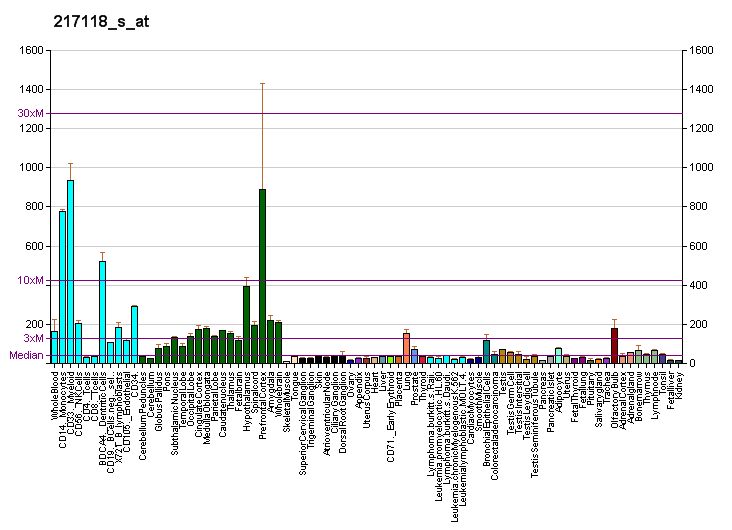
RNA expression pattern
Bgee	Human / Mouse (ortholog); Top expressed in: amygdala; putamen; right frontal lobe; Brodmann area 9; nucleus accumbens; internal globus pallidus; hypothalamus; caudate nucleus; C1 segment; ventral tegmental area / Top expressed in: vestibular membrane of cochlear duct; trigeminal ganglion; Rostral migratory stream; triceps brachii muscle; stria vascularis; iris; substantia nigra; fossa; decidua; condyle; More reference expression data
BioGPS	More reference expression data
Gene ontology
Molecular function	protein binding; molecular function
Cellular component	cellular component
Biological process	biological process
Sources:Amigo / QuickGO
Orthologs
Species	Human	Mouse
Entrez	23313	223739
Ensembl	ENSG00000100364	ENSMUSG00000036046
UniProt	Q6ICG6	Q3UE31
RefSeq (mRNA)	NM_001009880; NM_015264	NM_001033273; NM_001368660
RefSeq (protein)	NP_001009880; NP_056079	NP_001028445; NP_001355589
Location (UCSC)	Chr 22: 45.19 – 45.24 Mb	Chr 15: 84.83 – 84.87 Mb
PubMed search
- Wikidata
View/Edit Human	View/Edit Mouse

KIAA0930 is a protein that, in humans, is encoded by the KIAA0930 gene.
