= HMGXB4 =

Protein-coding gene in the species Homo sapiens

Identifiers
- Aliases: HMGXB4, Hmgxb4, 4733401K04Rik, AI316803, E430025G12, Hmgb2l1, HMG2L1, HMGBCG, THC211630, HMG-box containing 4, P53N
- External IDs: OMIM: 604702; MGI: 1918073; GeneCards: HMGXB4

Gene location (Human)
| Chr. | Chromosome 22 (human) |
| Band | 22q12.3 | Start | 35,257,452 bp |
| Band | 22q12.3 | End | 35,295,807 bp |

Gene location (Mouse)
| Chr. | Chromosome 8 (mouse) |
| Band | 8|8 C1 | Start | 75,719,984 bp |
| Band | 8|8 C1 | End | 75,758,606 bp |
RNA expression pattern
| Bgee | Human / Mouse (ortholog); Top expressed in: oocyte; secondary oocyte; buccal mucosa cell; sperm; sural nerve; testicle; ventricular zone; gonad; placenta; tibia / Top expressed in: zygote; secondary oocyte; genital tubercle; tail of embryo; primary oocyte; Rostral migratory stream; ventricular zone; primitive streak; medullary collecting duct; morula; More reference expression data |
| BioGPS | n/a |
Gene ontology
| Molecular function | DNA binding |
| Cellular component | NURF complex; nucleus |
| Biological process | negative regulation of Wnt signaling pathway; Wnt signaling pathway; endosome to lysosome transport |
Sources:Amigo / QuickGO
Orthologs
| Databases | NCBI: entry; OMA: entry |
| Species | Human | Mouse |
| Entrez | 10042 | 70823 |
| Ensembl | ENSG00000100281 | ENSMUSG00000034518 |
| UniProt | Q9UGU5 | n/a |
| RefSeq (mRNA) | NM_001003681; NM_005487; NM_014250; NM_001362972 | NM_178017; NM_001316753; NM_001316754 |
| RefSeq (protein) | NP_001003681; NP_001349901 | n/a |
| Location (UCSC) | Chr 22: 35.26 – 35.3 Mb | Chr 8: 75.72 – 75.76 Mb |
| PubMed search |
- Wikidata
| View/Edit Human | View/Edit Mouse |

HMG-box containing 4 is a protein that in humans is encoded by the HMGXB4 gene.

== Function ==
High mobility group (HMG) proteins are nonhistone chromosomal proteins. See HMG2 (MIM 163906) for additional information on HMG proteins.[supplied by OMIM, Nov 2010].
