= NOL12 =

Protein-coding gene in the species Homo sapiens

Identifiers
- Aliases: NOL12, Nop25, dJ37E16.7, nucleolar protein 12
- External IDs: MGI: 2146285; HomoloGene: 32577; GeneCards: NOL12; OMA:NOL12 - orthologs

Gene location (Human)
Chr.	Chromosome 22 (human)
Band	22q13.1	Start	37,681,673 bp
Band	22q13.1	End	37,693,476 bp

Gene location (Mouse)
Chr.	Chromosome 15 (mouse)
Band	15|15 E1	Start	78,819,133 bp
Band	15|15 E1	End	78,827,838 bp
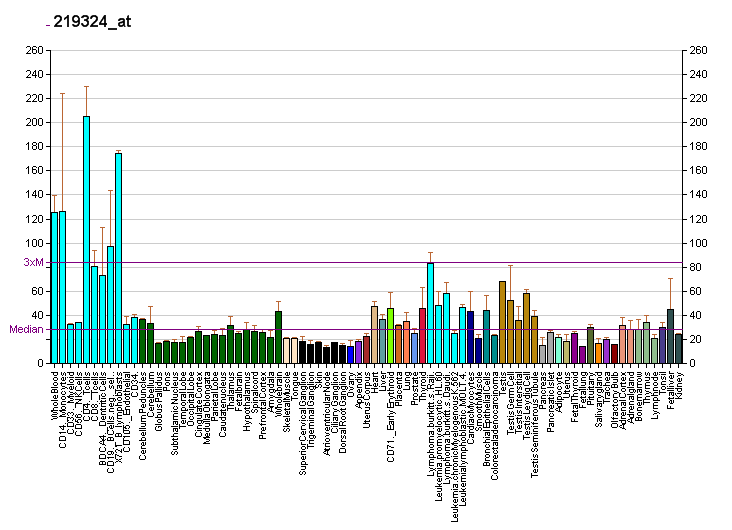

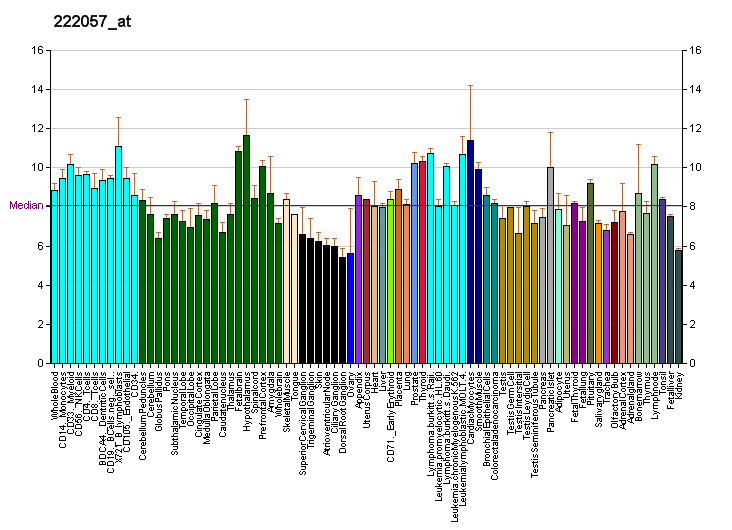
RNA expression pattern
Bgee	Human / Mouse (ortholog); Top expressed in: sural nerve; right testis; left testis; monocyte; mucosa of transverse colon; right hemisphere of cerebellum; right adrenal gland; granulocyte; left adrenal cortex; right adrenal cortex / Top expressed in: interventricular septum; morula; internal carotid artery; fossa; blastocyst; embryo; epiblast; condyle; external carotid artery; embryo; More reference expression data
BioGPS	More reference expression data
Gene ontology
Molecular function	rRNA binding; protein binding; RNA binding; single-stranded DNA binding
Cellular component	nucleolus; nucleus
Biological process	rRNA processing; nucleolus organization; positive regulation of cell population proliferation; positive regulation of cell growth; negative regulation of apoptotic process
Sources:Amigo / QuickGO
Orthologs
Species	Human	Mouse
Entrez	79159	97961
Ensembl	ENSG00000273899	ENSMUSG00000033099
UniProt	Q9UGY1	Q8BG17
RefSeq (mRNA)	NM_024313	NM_133800
RefSeq (protein)	NP_077289	NP_598561
Location (UCSC)	Chr 22: 37.68 – 37.69 Mb	Chr 15: 78.82 – 78.83 Mb
PubMed search
- Wikidata
View/Edit Human	View/Edit Mouse

Nucleolar protein 12 is a protein that in humans is encoded by the NOL12 gene. Human NOL12 has been shown to localize in the nucleolus and regulate nucleolar structure and homeostasis by maintaining the levels of multi-functional fibrillarin and nucleolin proteins. Its deficiency leads to p53 activation resulting in G2 arrest of cell. Nol12 or hNol12 drives p53 induced cell senescence suggesting its important role in aging. Human Nol12 is also required for ribosome maturation and genome integrity.

== Nol12 Family ==
Human Nol12 belongs to family of proteins known as ribosomal binding proteins RBPs. The human members have equivalents in different species. Its homologue in Drosophila melanogaster is called Viriato which is involved in eye and nervous system development and without Viriato, Drosophila melanogaster eye development fails. Loss of also Viriato resulted in cell proliferation, developmental delays and apoptosis. hNOL12 homologue in rats is known as Nop25 and is responsible for nucleolar structure and integrity. Its yeast homologue has been named as Rrp17 which has been shown to possess 5′-3′ exonuclease activity and is involved in ribosome biogenesis.
