= ADM2 =

Protein-coding gene in the species Homo sapiens

Identifiers
- Aliases: ADM2, AM2, dJ579N16.4, adrenomedullin 2
- External IDs: OMIM: 608682; MGI: 2675256; GeneCards: ADM2

Gene location (Human)
Chr.	Chromosome 22 (human)
Band	22q13.33	Start	50,481,543 bp
Band	22q13.33	End	50,486,440 bp

Gene location (Mouse)
Chr.	Chromosome 15 (mouse)
Band	15|15 E3	Start	89,206,923 bp
Band	15|15 E3	End	89,208,934 bp
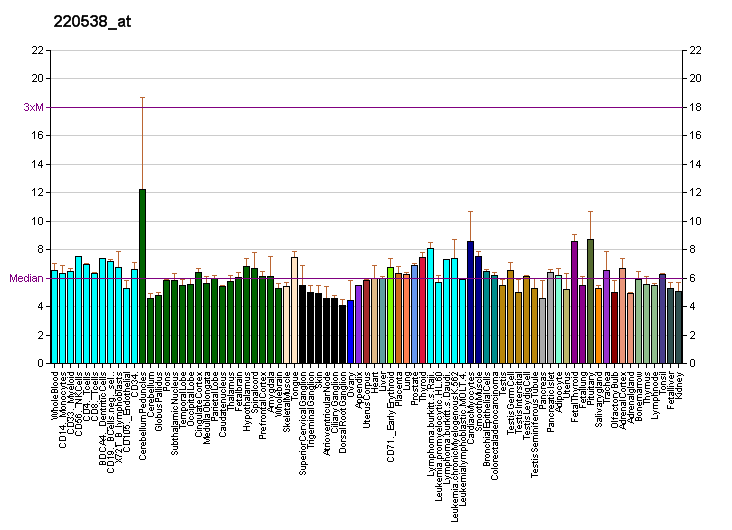
RNA expression pattern
Bgee	Human / Mouse (ortholog); Top expressed in: body of pancreas; left lobe of thyroid gland; stromal cell of endometrium; right lobe of thyroid gland; duodenum; lymph node; renal cortex; salivary gland; bone marrow cell; human kidney / Top expressed in: zygote; secondary oocyte; primary oocyte; morula; embryo; embryo; calvaria; right kidney; epiblast; blastocyst; More reference expression data
BioGPS	More reference expression data
Gene ontology
Molecular function	hormone activity; protein-containing complex binding
Cellular component	extracellular region; intracellular anatomical structure
Biological process	digestion; protein phosphorylation; positive regulation of gene expression; adenylate cyclase-activating G protein-coupled receptor signaling pathway; angiogenesis; feeding behavior; positive regulation of angiogenesis; negative regulation of blood pressure; regulation of signaling receptor activity; G protein-coupled receptor signaling pathway
Sources:Amigo / QuickGO
Orthologs
Databases	NCBI: entry; OMA: entry
Species	Human	Mouse
Entrez	79924	223780
Ensembl	ENSG00000128165	ENSMUSG00000054136
UniProt	Q7Z4H4	Q7TNK8
RefSeq (mRNA)	NM_024866; NM_001253845; NM_001369882	NM_182928
RefSeq (protein)	NP_001240774; NP_001356811	NP_891558
Location (UCSC)	Chr 22: 50.48 – 50.49 Mb	Chr 15: 89.21 – 89.21 Mb
PubMed search
- Wikidata
View/Edit Human	View/Edit Mouse

ADM2 is a protein that in humans is encoded by the ADM2 gene.

ADM2 belongs to a family of calcitonin (MIM 114130)-related peptide hormones important for regulating diverse physiologic functions and the chemical composition of fluids and tissues.[supplied by OMIM]
