= EP300 antisense RNA 1 =

Non-coding RNA in humans

An Error has occurred retrieving Wikidata item for infobox

EP300 antisense RNA 1 is a non-coding RNA that in humans is encoded by the EP300-AS1 gene.
