= Chemokine-like protein TAFA-5 =

Protein-coding gene in the species Homo sapiens

An Error has occurred retrieving Wikidata item for infobox Chemokine-like protein TAFA-5 is a protein that in humans is encoded by the TAFA5 gene.

This gene is a member of the TAFA family which is composed of five highly homologous genes that encode small secreted proteins. These proteins contain conserved cysteine residues at fixed positions, and are distantly related to CCL3, a member of the CC-chemokine family. The TAFA proteins are predominantly expressed in specific regions of the brain, and are postulated to function as brain-specific chemokines or neurokines, that act as regulators of immune and nervous cells.
