= IGLJ3 =

Gene in the species Homo sapiens

Identifiers
- Aliases: IGLJ3, J3, IGLJ3 (gene), immunoglobulin lambda joining 3
- External IDs: GeneCards: IGLJ3
Orthologs
Databases	NCBI: entry; OMA: entry
Species	Human	Mouse
Entrez	28831	n/a
Ensembl	ENSG00000211678	n/a
UniProt	n a	n/a
RefSeq (mRNA)	n/a	n/a
RefSeq (protein)	n/a	n/a
Location (UCSC)	n/a	n/a
PubMed search		n/a
- Wikidata
View/Edit Human

Immunoglobulin lambda joining 3 is a protein that in humans is encoded by the IGLJ3 gene.
