= Compartment (chemistry) =

Part of a protein that serves a specific function

In chemistry, a compartment is a part of a protein that serves a specific function. They are essentially protein subunits with the added condition that a compartment has distinct functionality, rather than being just a structural component.

There may be multiple compartments on one and the same protein. One example is the case of pyruvate dehydrogenase complex. This is the enzyme which catalyses pyruvate decarboxylation, the reaction of pyruvate with coenzyme A and the major entry point into the TCA cycle:

Pyruvate + Coenzyme A + NAD^{+} ⇒ acetyl-CoA + NADH + H^{+} + CO_{2}

Pyruvate dehydrogenase has three chemical compartments; E1 (pyruvate decarboxylase), E2 (dihydrolipoyl transacetylase) and E3 (dihydrolipoyl dehydrogenase). Each one of the compartments has its own specific function.
