= TEF (gene) =

Protein-coding gene in the species Homo sapiens

Identifiers
- Aliases: TEF, PAR bZIP transcription factor, TEF transcription factor, PAR bZIP family member
- External IDs: OMIM: 188595; MGI: 98663; GeneCards: TEF

Gene location (Human)
| Chr. | Chromosome 22 (human) |
| Band | 22q13.2 | Start | 41,367,333 bp |
| Band | 22q13.2 | End | 41,399,326 bp |

Gene location (Mouse)
| Chr. | Chromosome 15 (mouse) |
| Band | 15 E1|15 38.25 cM | Start | 81,686,622 bp |
| Band | 15 E1|15 38.25 cM | End | 81,711,064 bp |
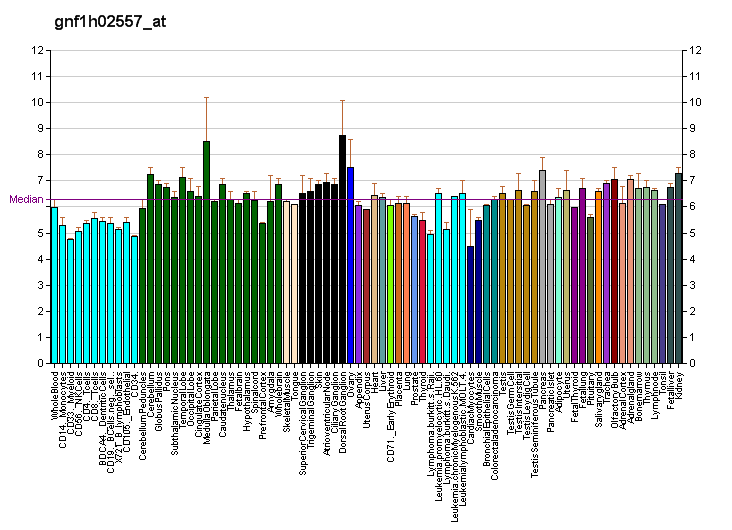
RNA expression pattern
| Bgee | Human / Mouse (ortholog); Top expressed in: cerebellar hemisphere; right hemisphere of cerebellum; right frontal lobe; nucleus accumbens; external globus pallidus; parietal lobe; postcentral gyrus; parotid gland; lateral nuclear group of thalamus; caudate nucleus / Top expressed in: superior frontal gyrus; perirhinal cortex; entorhinal cortex; olfactory tubercle; dentate gyrus of hippocampal formation granule cell; neural layer of retina; cerebellar cortex; CA3 field; muscle of thigh; ankle; More reference expression data |
| BioGPS | More reference expression data |
Gene ontology
| Molecular function | DNA-binding transcription factor activity; sequence-specific DNA binding; DNA binding; double-stranded DNA binding; protein binding; RNA polymerase II transcription regulatory region sequence-specific DNA binding; DNA-binding transcription activator activity, RNA polymerase II-specific; DNA-binding transcription factor activity, RNA polymerase II-specific |
| Cellular component | nucleus |
| Biological process | regulation of transcription by RNA polymerase II; regulation of transcription, DNA-templated; transcription, DNA-templated; positive regulation of transcription by RNA polymerase II; rhythmic process; transcription by RNA polymerase II; multicellular organism development |
Sources:Amigo / QuickGO
Orthologs
| Databases | NCBI: entry; OMA: entry |
| Species | Human | Mouse |
| Entrez | 7008 | 21685 |
| Ensembl | ENSG00000167074 | ENSMUSG00000022389 |
| UniProt | Q10587 | Q9JLC6 |
| RefSeq (mRNA) | NM_003216; NM_001145398 | NM_017376; NM_153484 |
| RefSeq (protein) | NP_001138870; NP_003207 | NP_059072; NP_705617 |
| Location (UCSC) | Chr 22: 41.37 – 41.4 Mb | Chr 15: 81.69 – 81.71 Mb |
| PubMed search |
- Wikidata
| View/Edit Human | View/Edit Mouse |

Thyrotroph embryonic factor is a protein that in humans is encoded by the TEF gene.

Thyrotroph embryonic factor (TEF), a transcription factor, is a member of the PAR (proline and acidic amino acid-rich) subfamily of basic region/leucine zipper (bZIP) transcription factors. It is expressed in a broad range of cells and tissues in adult animals, however, during embryonic development, TEF expression appears to be restricted to the developing anterior pituitary gland, coincident with the appearance of thyroid-stimulating hormone, beta (TSHB). Indeed, TEF can bind to, and transactivate the TSHB promoter.

It shows homology (in the functional domains) with other members of the PAR-bZIP subfamily of transcription factors, which include albumin D box-binding protein (DBP), human hepatic leukemia factor (HLF) and chicken vitellogenin gene-binding protein (VBP); VBP is considered the chicken homologue of TEF. Different members of the subfamily can readily form heterodimers, and share DNA-binding, and transcriptional regulatory properties.
