= Truncus =

Truncus may refer to:

== Anatomy ==
- Persistent truncus arteriosus, a rare congenital heart disease
- Truncus arteriosus (embryology), part of an embryo's developing circulatory system
- A pulmonary artery (truncus pulmonalis)
- Lumbosacral trunk (truncus lumbosacralis)
- Costocervical trunk (truncus costocervicalis)
- Sympathetic trunk (truncus Sympaticus)
- Celiac artery (truncus coeliacus)
- Brachiocephalic artery (truncus brachiocephalicus)
- Trunk (anatomy) (truncus)

== Other ==
- Truncus (mathematics), a particular algebraic curve
