= Primitive ventricle =

Structure of the developing heart

Embryonic ventricle
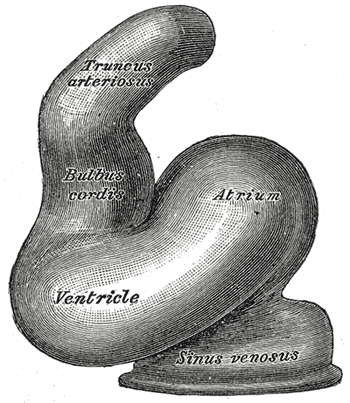
- Tubular heart of human embryo of about fourteen days.

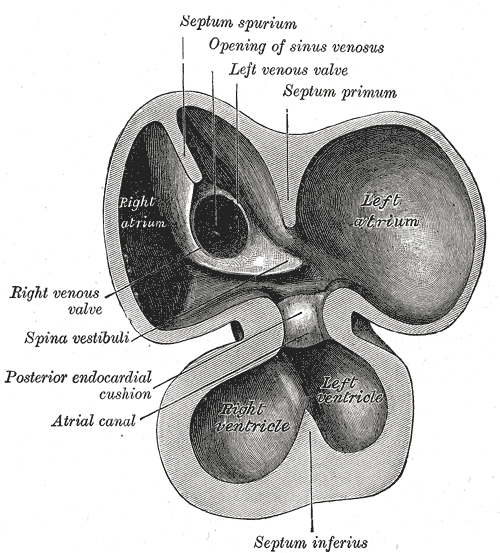
- Interior of dorsal half of heart from a human embryo of about thirty days.

Details
- Carnegie stage: 11
- Gives rise to: trabeculated parts of right ventricle, left ventricle
- System: Cardiovascular system

Identifiers
- Latin: ventriculus embryonicus
- TE: ventricle_by_E5.11.1.3.1.0.2 E5.11.1.3.1.0.2

The primitive ventricle or embryonic ventricle of the developing heart, together with the bulbus cordis that lies in front of it, gives rise to the left and right ventricles. The primitive ventricle provides the trabeculated parts of the walls, and the bulbus cordis the smooth parts.

The primitive ventricle becomes divided by the septum inferius which develops into the interventricular septum. The septum grows upward from the lower part of the ventricle, at a position marked on the heart's surface by a furrow.

Its dorsal part increases more rapidly than its ventral portion, and fuses with the dorsal part of the septum intermedium.

For a time an interventricular foramen exists above its ventral portion, but this foramen is ultimately closed by the fusion of the aortic septum with the ventricular septum.

== Additional images ==
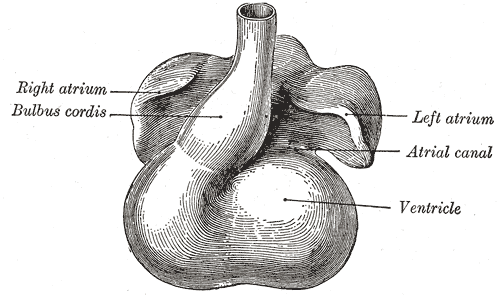
Heart showing expansion of the atria.
