= Aorta =

Largest artery in the human body

- Schematic view of the aorta and its segments

- Branches of the aorta

Details
- Pronunciation: /eɪˈɔːrtə/
- Precursor: Truncus arteriosus, fourth left branchial artery, paired dorsal aortae (combine into the single descending aorta)
- Source: Left ventricle
- Branches: Ascending aorta: Right and left coronary arteries Arch of aorta (supra-aortic vessels): Brachiocephalic trunk Left common carotid artery Left subclavian artery Descending aorta, thoracic part: Left bronchial arteries Esophageal arteries to the thoracic part of the esophagus Third to eleventh posterior intercostal arteries and the subcostal arteries Descending aorta, abdominal part: Parietal branches: Inferior phrenic arteries Lumbar arteries Median sacral artery Visceral branches: Celiac trunk Middle suprarenal arteries Superior mesenteric artery Renal arteries Gonadal arteries (testicular in males, ovarian in females) Inferior mesenteric artery Terminal branches: Common iliac arteries Median sacral artery
- Vein: Combination of coronary sinus, superior vena cava and inferior vena cava
- Supplies: The systemic circulation (entire body with exception of the respiratory zone of the lung which is supplied by the pulmonary circulation)

Identifiers
- Latin: aorta, arteria maxima
- MeSH: D001011
- TA98: A12.2.02.001
- TA2: 4175
- FMA: 3734

The aorta (/eɪˈɔːrtə/ ay-OR-tə; pl.: aortas or aortae) is the main and largest artery in the human body, originating from the left ventricle of the heart, branching upwards immediately after, and extending down to the abdomen, where it splits at the aortic bifurcation into two smaller arteries (the common iliac arteries). The aorta distributes oxygenated blood to all parts of the body through the systemic circulation.

== Structure ==
=== Sections ===
Course of the aorta in the thorax (anterior view), starting posterior to the main pulmonary artery, then anterior to the right pulmonary arteries, the trachea and the esophagus, then turning posteriorly to course dorsally to these structures.

In anatomical sources, the aorta is usually divided into sections for easier understanding.

One way of classifying a part of the aorta is by anatomical compartment, where the thoracic aorta (or thoracic portion of the aorta) runs from the heart to the diaphragm. The aorta then continues downward as the abdominal aorta (or abdominal portion of the aorta) from the diaphragm to the aortic bifurcation.

Another system divides the aorta with respect to its course and the direction of blood flow. In this system, the aorta starts as the ascending aorta, travels superiorly from the heart, and then makes a hairpin turn known as the aortic arch. Following the aortic arch, the aorta then travels inferiorly as the descending aorta. The descending aorta has two parts. The aorta begins to descend in the thoracic cavity and is consequently known as the thoracic aorta. After the aorta passes through the diaphragm, it is known as the abdominal aorta. The aorta ends by dividing into two major blood vessels, the common iliac arteries and a smaller midline vessel, the median sacral artery.

==== Ascending aorta ====
The ascending aorta begins at the opening of the aortic valve in the left ventricle of the heart. It runs through a common pericardial sheath with the pulmonary trunk. These two blood vessels twist around each other, causing the aorta to start out posterior to the pulmonary trunk, but end by twisting to its right and anterior side. The transition from ascending aorta to aortic arch is at the pericardial reflection on the aorta.

At the root of the ascending aorta, the lumen has small pockets between the cusps of the aortic valve and the wall of the aorta, which are called the aortic sinuses or the sinuses of Valsalva. The left aortic sinus contains the origin of the left coronary artery and the right aortic sinus likewise gives rise to the right coronary artery. Together, these two arteries supply the heart. The posterior aortic sinus does not give rise to a coronary artery. For this reason the left, right and posterior aortic sinuses are also called left-coronary, right-coronary and non-coronary sinuses.

==== Aortic arch ====
The aortic arch loops over the left pulmonary artery and the bifurcation of the pulmonary trunk, to which it remains connected by the ligamentum arteriosum, a remnant of the fetal circulation that is obliterated a few days after birth. In addition to these blood vessels, the aortic arch crosses the left main bronchus. Between the aortic arch and the pulmonary trunk is a network of autonomic nerve fibers, the cardiac plexus or aortic plexus. The left vagus nerve, which passes anterior to the aortic arch, gives off a major branch, the recurrent laryngeal nerve, which loops under the aortic arch just lateral to the ligamentum arteriosum. It then runs back to the neck.

The aortic arch has three major branches: from proximal to distal, they are the brachiocephalic trunk, the left common carotid artery, and the left subclavian artery. The brachiocephalic trunk supplies the right side of the head and neck as well as the right arm and chest wall, while the latter two together supply the left side of the same regions.

The aortic arch ends, and the descending aorta begins at the level of the intervertebral disc between the fourth and fifth thoracic vertebrae.

==== Thoracic aorta ====
The thoracic aorta gives rise to the intercostal and subcostal arteries, as well as to the superior and inferior left bronchial arteries and variable branches to the esophagus, mediastinum, and pericardium. Its lowest pair of branches are the superior phrenic arteries, which supply the diaphragm, and the subcostal arteries for the twelfth rib.

==== Abdominal aorta ====
The abdominal aorta begins at the aortic hiatus of the diaphragm at the level of the twelfth thoracic vertebra. It gives rise to lumbar and musculophrenic arteries, renal and middle suprarenal arteries, and visceral arteries (the celiac trunk, the superior mesenteric artery and the inferior mesenteric artery). It ends in a bifurcation into the left and right common iliac arteries. At the point of the bifurcation, there also springs a smaller branch, the median sacral artery.

=== Development ===
The ascending aorta develops from the outflow tract, which initially starts as a single tube connecting the heart with the aortic arches (which will form the great arteries) in early development but is then separated into the aorta and the pulmonary trunk.

The aortic arches start as five pairs of symmetrical arteries connecting the heart with the dorsal aorta, and then undergo a significant remodelling to form the final asymmetrical structure of the great arteries, with the 3rd pair of arteries contributing to the common carotids, the right 4th forming the base and middle part of the right subclavian artery and the left 4th being the central part of the aortic arch. The smooth muscle of the great arteries and the population of cells that form the aorticopulmonary septum that separates the aorta and pulmonary artery is derived from cardiac neural crest. This contribution of the neural crest to the great artery smooth muscle is unusual as most smooth muscle is derived from mesoderm. In fact the smooth muscle within the abdominal aorta is derived from mesoderm, and the coronary arteries, which arise just above the semilunar valves, possess smooth muscle of mesodermal origin. A failure of the aorticopulmonary septum to divide the great vessels results in persistent truncus arteriosus.

=== Microanatomy ===
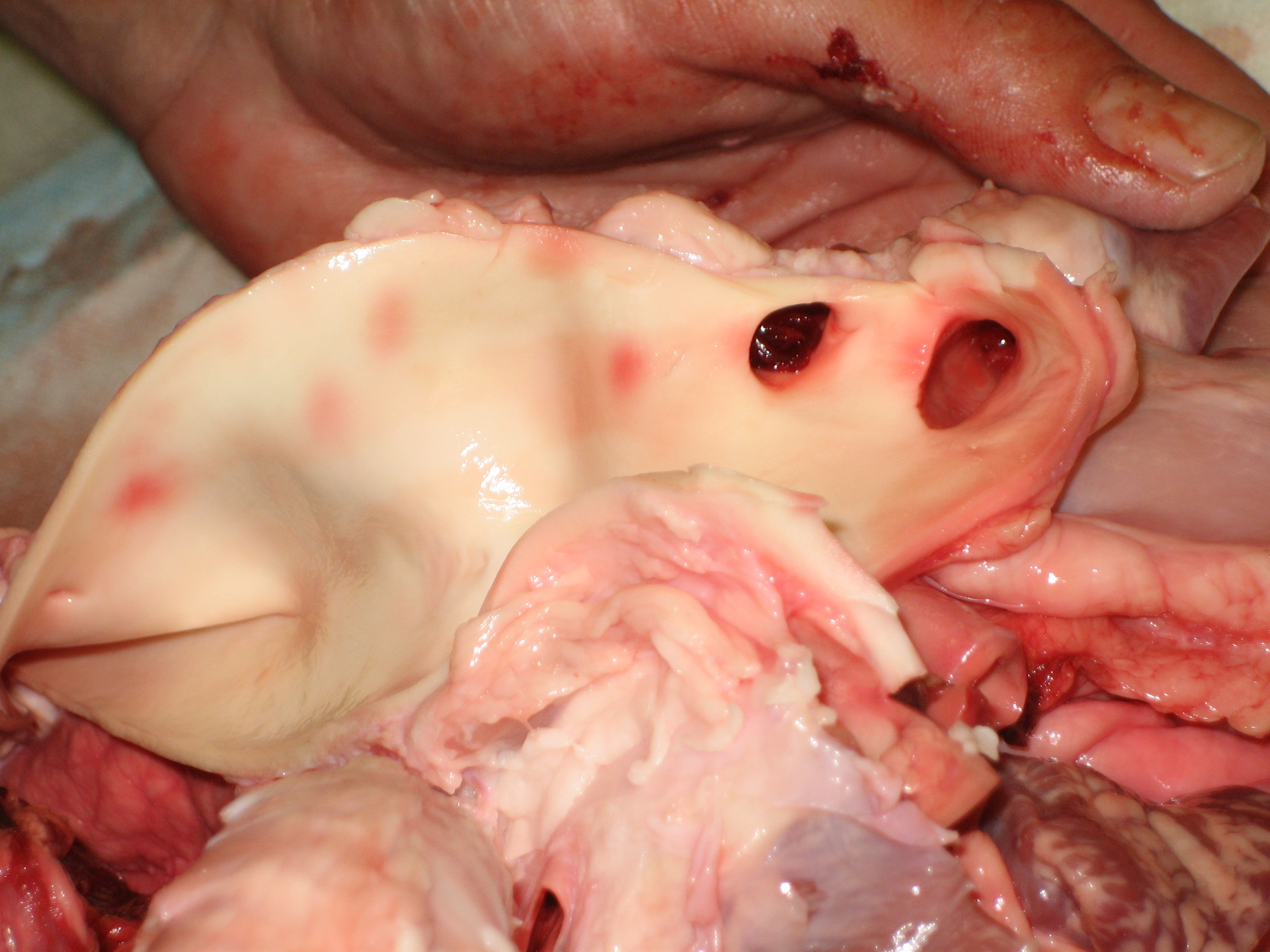
A pig's aorta cut open, also showing some branching arteries.

The aorta is an elastic artery, and as such is quite distensible. The aorta consists of a heterogeneous mixture of smooth muscle, nerves, intimal cells, endothelial cells, immune cells, fibroblast-like cells, and a complex extracellular matrix. The vascular wall is subdivided into three layers known as the tunica externa, tunica media, and tunica intima. The aorta is covered by an extensive network of tiny blood vessels called vasa vasorum, which feed the tunica externa and tunica media, the outer layers of the aorta. The aortic arch contains baroreceptors and chemoreceptors that relay information concerning blood pressure and blood pH and carbon dioxide levels to the medulla oblongata of the brain. This information along with information from baroreceptors and chemoreceptors located elsewhere is processed by the brain and the autonomic nervous system mediates appropriate homeostatic responses.

Within the tunica media, smooth muscle and the extracellular matrix are quantitatively the largest components, these are arranged concentrically as musculoelastic layers (the elastic lamella) in mammals. The elastic lamella, which comprise smooth muscle and elastic matrix, can be considered as the fundamental structural unit of the aorta and consist of elastic fibers, collagens (predominately type III), proteoglycans, and glycoaminoglycans. The elastic matrix dominates the biomechanical properties of the aorta. The smooth muscle component, while contractile, does not substantially alter the diameter of the aorta, but rather serves to increase the stiffness and viscoelasticity of the aortic wall when activated.

=== Variation ===
Variations may occur in the location of the aorta, and the way in which arteries branch off the aorta. The aorta, normally on the left side of the body, may be found on the right in dextrocardia, in which the heart is found on the right, or situs inversus, in which the location of all organs are flipped.

Variations in the branching of individual arteries may also occur. For example, the left vertebral artery may arise from the aorta, instead of the left common carotid artery.

In patent ductus arteriosus, a congenital disorder, the fetal ductus arteriosus fails to close, leaving an open vessel connecting the pulmonary artery to the proximal descending aorta.

== Function ==
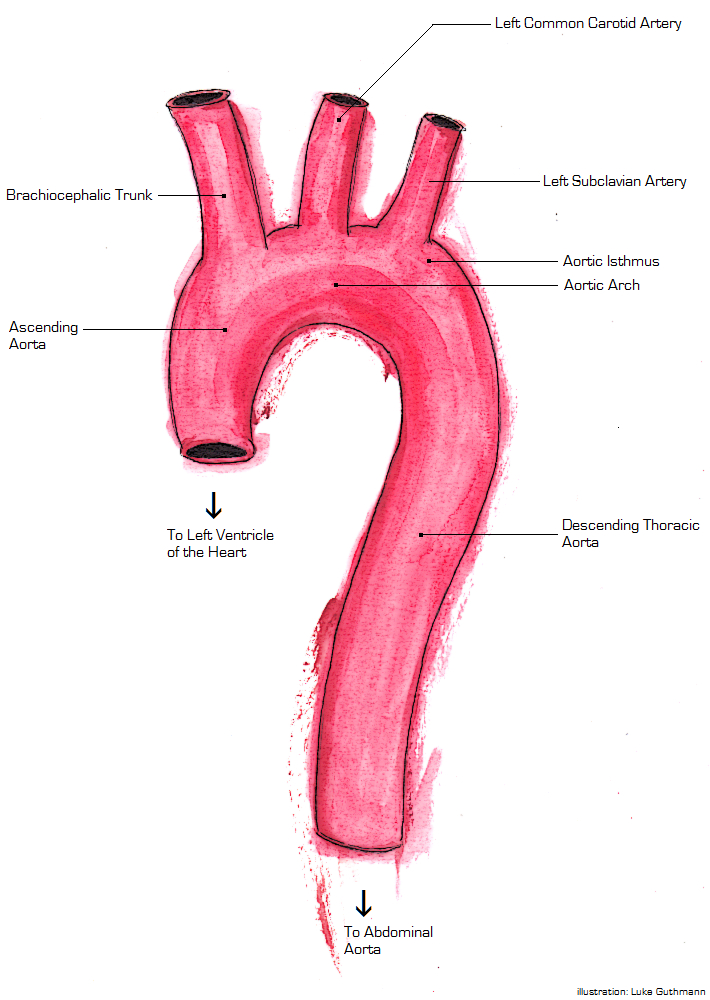
Major aorta anatomy displaying ascending aorta, brachiocephalic trunk, left common carotid artery, left subclavian artery, aortic isthmus, aortic arch, and descending thoracic aorta

The aorta supplies all of the systemic circulation, which means that the entire body, except for the respiratory zone of the lung, receives its blood from the aorta. Broadly speaking, branches from the ascending aorta supply the heart; branches from the aortic arch supply the head, neck, and arms; branches from the thoracic descending aorta supply the chest (excluding the heart and the respiratory zone of the lung); and branches from the abdominal aorta supply the abdomen. The pelvis and legs get their blood from the common iliac arteries.

=== Blood flow and velocity ===
The contraction of the heart during systole is responsible for ejection and creates a (pulse) wave that is propagated down the aorta, into the arterial tree. The wave is reflected at sites of impedance mismatching, such as bifurcations, where reflected waves rebound to return to semilunar valves and the origin of the aorta. These return waves create the dicrotic notch displayed in the aortic pressure curve during the cardiac cycle as these reflected waves push on the aortic semilunar valve. With age, the aorta stiffens such that the pulse wave is propagated faster and reflected waves return to the heart faster before the semilunar valve closes, which raises the blood pressure. The stiffness of the aorta is associated with a number of diseases and pathologies, and noninvasive measures of the pulse wave velocity are an independent indicator of hypertension. Measuring the pulse wave velocity (invasively and non-invasively) is a means of determining arterial stiffness. Maximum aortic velocity may be noted as V_{max} or less commonly as AoV_{max}.

Mean arterial pressure (MAP) is highest in the aorta, and the MAP decreases across the circulation from aorta to arteries to arterioles to capillaries to veins back to atrium. The difference between aortic and right atrial pressure accounts for blood flow in the circulation. When the left ventricle contracts to force blood into the aorta, the aorta expands. This stretching gives the potential energy that will help maintain blood pressure during diastole, as during this time the aorta contracts passively. This Windkessel effect of the great elastic arteries has important biomechanical implications. The elastic recoil helps conserve the energy from the pumping heart and smooth out the pulsatile nature created by the heart. Aortic pressure is highest at the aorta and becomes less pulsatile and lower pressure as blood vessels divide into arteries, arterioles, and capillaries such that flow is slow and smooth for gases and nutrient exchange.

== Significance ==
Central aortic blood pressure has frequently been shown to have greater prognostic value and to show a more accurate response to antihypertensive drugs than has peripheral blood pressure.

- Aortic aneurysm – mycotic, bacterial (e.g. syphilis), senile, genetic, associated with valvular heart disease
- Aortic coarctation – pre-ductal, post-ductal
- Aortic dissection
- Aortic stenosis
- Abdominal aortic aneurysm
- Aortitis, inflammation of the aorta that can be seen in trauma, infections, and autoimmune disease
- Atherosclerosis
- Ehlers–Danlos syndrome
- Marfan syndrome
- Trauma, such as traumatic aortic rupture, most often thoracic and distal to the left subclavian artery and often quickly fatal
- Transposition of the great vessels, see also dextro-Transposition of the great arteries and levo-Transposition of the great arteries

== Other animals ==
All amniotes have a broadly similar arrangement to that of humans, albeit with a number of individual variations. In fish, however, there are two separate vessels referred to as aortas. The ventral aorta carries de-oxygenated blood from the heart to the gills; part of this vessel forms the ascending aorta in tetrapods (the remainder forms the pulmonary artery). A second, dorsal aorta carries oxygenated blood from the gills to the rest of the body and is homologous with the descending aorta of tetrapods. The two aortas are connected by a number of vessels, one passing through each of the gills. Amphibians also retain the fifth connecting vessel, so that the aorta has two parallel arches.

== History ==
The word aorta stems from the Late Latin aorta from Classical Greek aortē (ἀορτή), from aeirō, "I lift, raise" (ἀείρω) This term was first applied by Aristotle when describing the aorta and describes accurately how it seems to be "suspended" above the heart.

The function of the aorta is documented in the Talmud, where it is noted as one of three major vessels entering or leaving the heart, and where perforation is linked to death.

In the 16th century, Leonardo da Vinci poured molten wax into an ox's heart and made a hollow glass model in the shape of the wax cast. This glass model included the aortic valve. Through his experiments, Leonardo discovered the hemodynamical function of the aortic sinuses in closing the aortic valve.
