= Persistent truncus arteriosus =

- Other names: Truncus Arteriosus, Truncus Arteriosus Communis, Patent truncus arteriosus, or Common arterial trunk
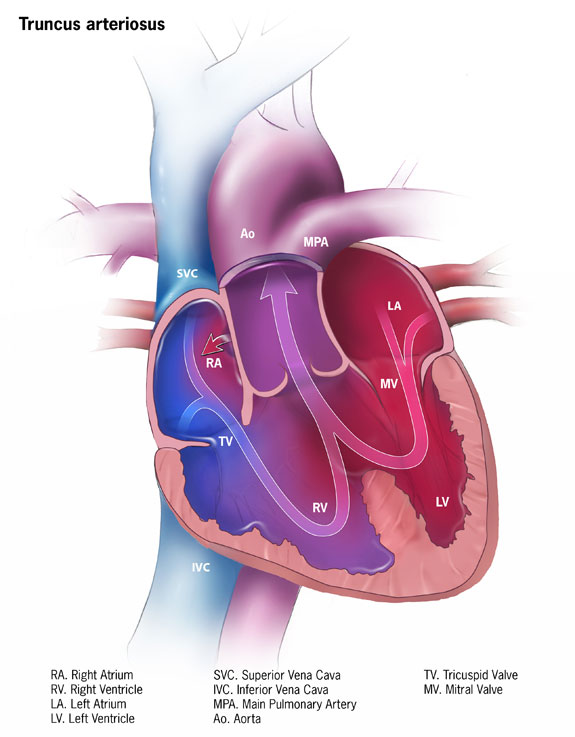
- Illustration of truncus arteriosus
- Specialty: Medical genetics

Persistent truncus arteriosus (PTA), often referred to simply as truncus arteriosus, is a rare form of congenital heart disease that presents at birth. In this condition, the embryological structure known as the truncus arteriosus fails to properly divide into the pulmonary trunk and aorta. This results in one arterial trunk arising from the heart and providing mixed blood to the coronary arteries, pulmonary arteries, and systemic circulation. For the International Classification of Diseases (ICD-11), the International Paediatric and Congenital Cardiac Code (IPCCC) was developed to standardize the nomenclature of congenital heart disease. Under this system, English is now the official language, and persistent truncus arteriosus should properly be termed common arterial trunk.

== Causes ==
Most of the time, this defect occurs spontaneously. Genetic disorders and teratogens (viruses, metabolic imbalance, and industrial or pharmacological agents) have been associated as possible causes. Up to 50% (varies in studies) of cases are associated with chromosome 22q11 deletions (DiGeorge Syndrome). The neural crest, specifically a population known as the cardiac neural crest, directly contributes to the aorticopulmonary septum.

Microablation of the cardiac neural crest in developing chick embryos and genetic anomalies affecting this population of cells in rodents results in persistent truncus arteriosus.

Numerous perturbations affecting the cardiac neural crest have been associated with persistent truncus arteriosus, some of which include growth factors (fibroblast growth factor 8 and bone morphogenetic protein), transcription factors (T-box, Pax, Nkx2-5, GATA-6, and Forkhead), and gap junction proteins (Connexin). The cardiac neural crest also contributes the smooth muscle of the great arteries.

== Pathophysiology ==

Anatomical changes associated with this disorder includes:

- single artery arising from the two ventricles which gives rise to both the aortic and pulmonary vessels
- abnormal truncal valve
- right sided aortic arch in about 30% of cases (not shown)
- large ventricular septal defect
- pulmonary hypertension
- complete mixing occurring at level of the great vessel
- right-to-left shunting of blood

== Diagnosis ==
The diagnosis is based on:

- Cyanosis presents at birth
- Heart failure may occur within weeks
- Systolic ejection murmur is heard at the left sternal border
- Widened pulse pressure
- Bounding arterial pulses
- Loud second heart sound
- Biventricular hypertrophy
- Cardiomegaly
- Increased pulmonary vascularity
- Hypocalcemia (if associated with DiGeorge syndrome)

=== Classification ===
A well-known classification is the fourfold system developed by Collett and Edwards in 1949. Collett/Edwards Types I, II, and III are distinguished by the branching pattern of the pulmonary arteries:

- Type I: The branch pulmonary arteries arise from a single "main pulmonary artery" arising from the lateral surface of the common trunk
- Type II: The branch pulmonary arteries arises separately, but near each other posteriorly off the common trunk
- Type III: The branch pulmonary arteries arise separately and far apart off the common trunk
- Type IV: The branch pulmonary arteries arise distally off the aorta, or the lungs are supplied by multiple aortopulmonary collaterals. Type IV is now considered a form of Tetralogy of Fallot and not Common Arterial Trunk.

Another well-known classification was defined by Stella and Richard Van Praagh in 1965. In this classification scheme, the preceding letter ("A" or "B") refers to the presence or absence, respectively, of a ventricular septal defect. Type B common arterial trunk is extremely rare; so below, only Type A is considered:

- Type A1: The branch pulmonary arteries arise from a single "main pulmonary artery" arising from the lateral surface of the common trunk (Collett & Edwards Type I)
- Type A2: The branch pulmonary arteries arise separately off the common trunk (includes both Collett & Edwards Types II and III).
- Type A3: One branch pulmonary artery arises off the common trunk, and one branch pulmonary artery is isolated, arising from a patent ductus arteriosus.
- Type A4: Common arterial trunk in association with interrupted aortic arch.

As both of the above schemes involve four numerals, they can be easily confused. For this reason, the Collette & Edwards scheme usually uses roman numerals while the Van Praagh system uses arabic numerals and the preceding "A". Ambiguity as to the system being used can lead to misunderstanding.

The classification in the International Paediatric and Congenital Cardiac Code (IPCCC) attempts to eliminate this source of confusion with the following nomenclature scheme, which removes the use of numbered types:

- Common arterial trunk with aortic dominance and both pulmonary arteries arising from trunk (includes Collette & Edwards Types I, II, and III and Van Praagh types 1 and 2).
- Common arterial trunk with aortic dominance and one pulmonary artery absent from trunk, isolated pulmonary artery (Van Praagh type 3).
- Common arterial trunk with pulmonary dominance and aortic arch obstruction (Van Praagh type 4)

== Treatment ==
Treatment is with neonatal surgical repair, with the objective of restoring a normal pattern of blood flow. The surgery is open heart, and the patient will be placed on cardiopulmonary bypass to allow the surgeon to work on a still heart. The heart is opened and the ventricular septal defect is closed with a patch. The pulmonary arteries are then detached from the common artery (truncus arteriosus) and connected to the right ventricle using a tube (a conduit or tunnel). The common artery, now separated from the pulmonary circulation, functions as the aorta with the truncal valve operating as the aortic valve. Most babies survive this surgical repair, but may require further surgery as they grow up. For example, the conduit does not grow with the child and may need to be replaced as the child grows. Furthermore, the truncal valve is often abnormal and may require future surgery to improve its function. There have been cases where the condition has been diagnosed at birth and surgical intervention is an option. A number of these cases have survived well into adulthood.

== Epidemiology ==
Persistent truncus arteriosus is a rare cardiac abnormality that has a prevalence of less than 1%.

== Additional images ==
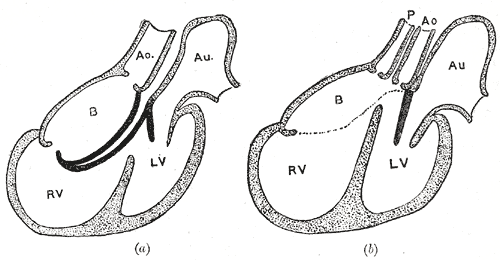
Diagrams to illustrate the transformation of the bulbus cordis. Ao. Truncus arteriosus. Au. Atrium. B. Bulbus cordis. RV. Right ventricle. LV. Left ventricle. P. Pulmonary artery.

== See also ==
- Truncus arteriosus (embryology)
- Patent ductus arteriosus
