= Interventricular foramen =

Interventricular foramen may refer to:

- Interventricular foramen (embryology)
- Interventricular foramina (neuroanatomy)
