= Tubular heart =

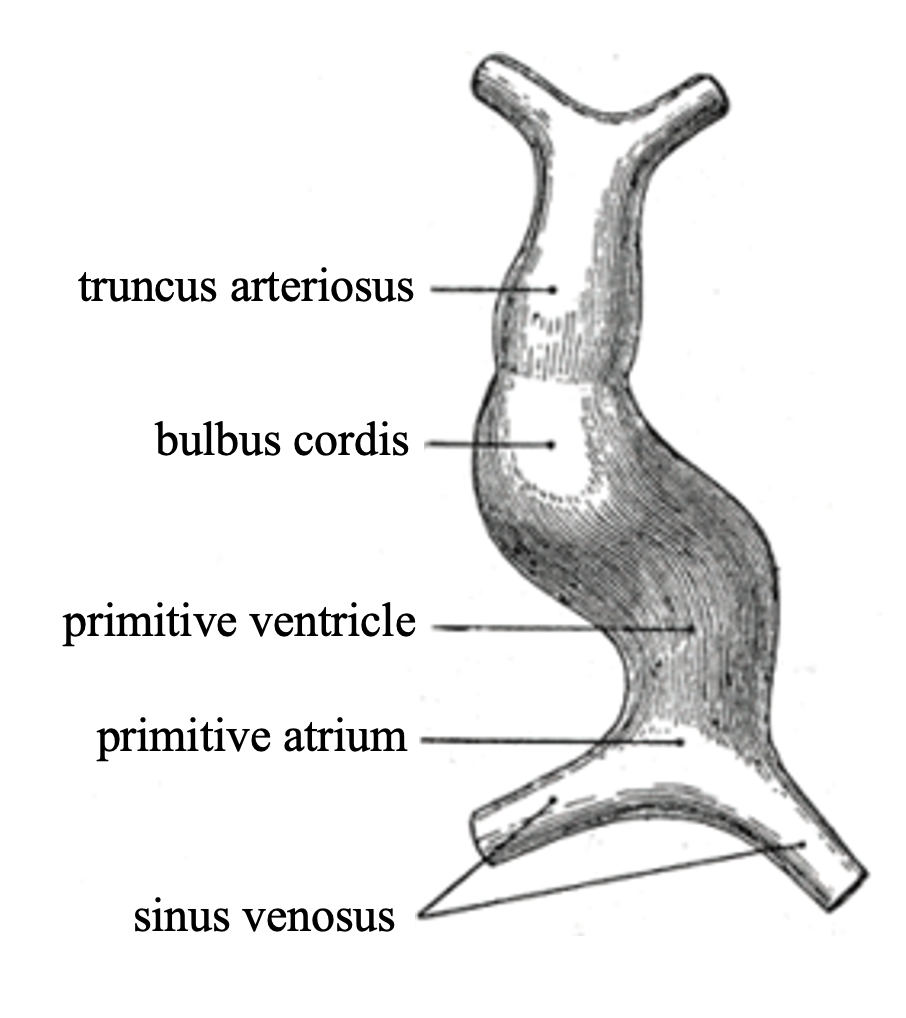
- Diagram to illustrate the simple tubular condition of the heart

Details
- Days: 22
- Precursor: Splanchnic mesoderm
- Gives rise to: Heart

Identifiers
- Latin: cor tubulare
- TE: heart_by_E5.11.1.1.1.0.5 E5.11.1.1.1.0.5

The term tubular heart has two definitions, one for developmental biology, and one for evolutionary biology. In evolutionary biology, the term refers to a peristaltic heart tube that evolved in early Bilateria, which consists of a single layer of contracting mesoderm but lacks chambers, valves, and blood vessels.

In developmental biology, the tubular heart or primitive heart tube is the earliest stage of heart development in vertebrates. The heart is the first functional organ to form during human embryogenesis, beginning in the third week. In the cardiogenic region of the embryo, paired endocardial tubes fuse to form a single linear structure known as the tubular heart. This tube later undergoes looping and separation to form the multi-chambered heart.

== Embryonic origin ==
During gastrulation (day 14-21 of development), the human embryo is organized into three germ layers: ectoderm, mesoderm, and endoderm. The tubular heart forms primarily from splanchnic mesoderm of the lateral plate mesoderm around day 18. Signals from the adjacent endoderm induce mesodermal cells, known as blood islands, to differentiate into angioblasts. Through vasculogenesis at day 20, angioblasts organize into an endothelial lining that form the paired endocardial tubes. These tubes form on either side of the embryo's midline within the cardiogenic region. Behind them, two coelomic spaces appear within the lateral plate mesoderm.

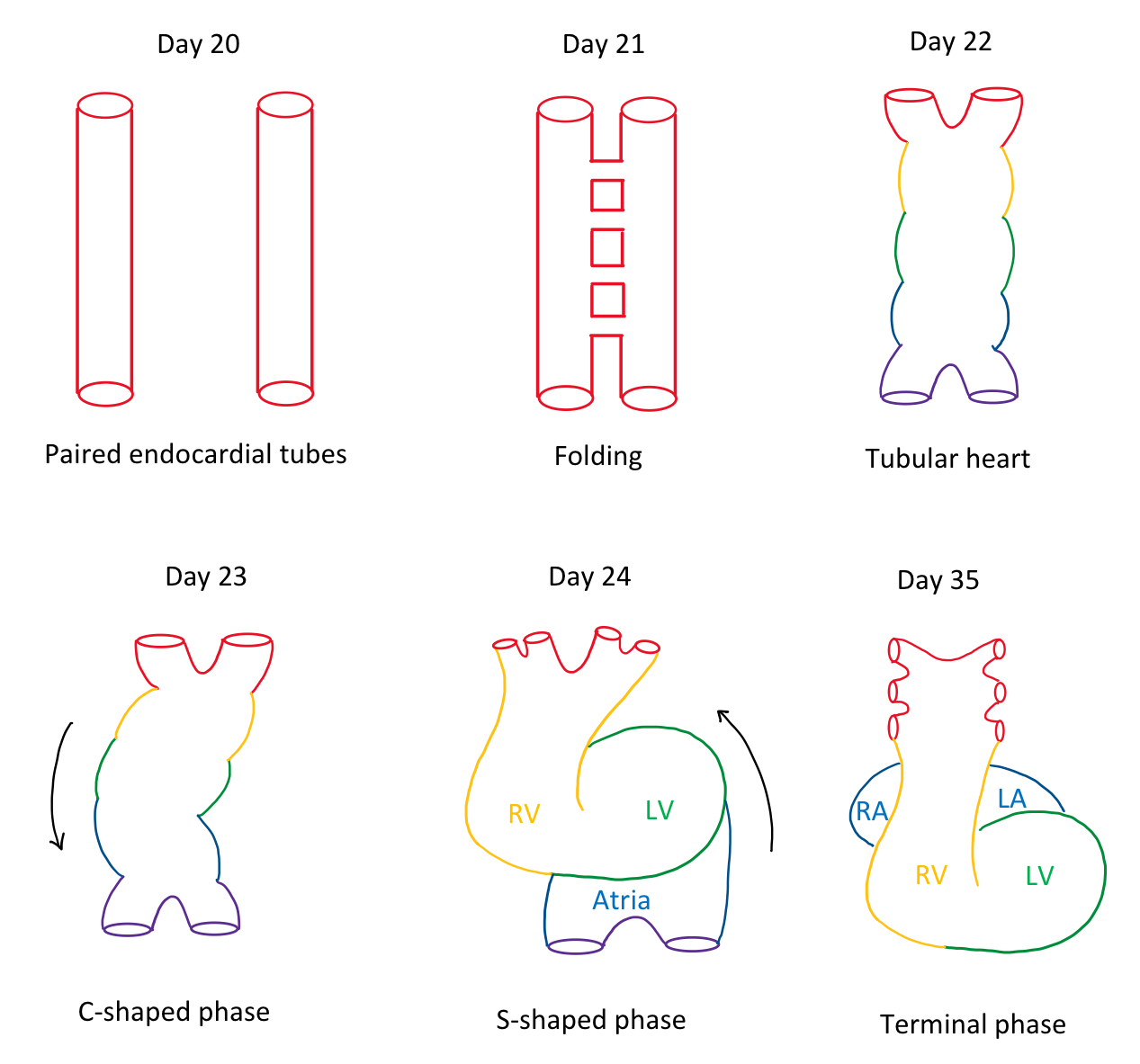
Diagram of early human heart development. RV: right ventricle; LV: left ventricle; RA: right atrium; LA: left atrium.

== Folding ==
The tubular heart develops through folding in two directions. By day 21-22, lateral folding brings the paired endocardial tubes together, fusing them into a single primitive heart tube. The coelomic spaces merge to form a single horseshoe-shaped intraembryonic coelom, which later becomes the pericardial cavity. The heart tube is suspended within the cavity by the dorsal mesocardium, which is a temporary layer of tissue that connects to the developing heart tube, and later degenerates to allow further growth. Cephalocaudal folding bends the embryo's head and tail, moving the developing heart tube from the head region into the pericardial cavity.

== Layers ==
The tubular heart consists of three layers essential for proper heart function, corresponding to those in the adult human heart: endocardium, myocardium, and epicardium, from inside to outside. The endocardium is derived from the endothelial lining and acts as a barrier between blood and surrounding tissues. The myocardium is composed of cardiac myoblasts. It constitutes the muscular bulk of the heart and generates the cardiac jelly, a matrix layer that separates it from the endocardium. This layer is responsible for the contractile function of the heart. The epicardium (visceral serous layer of pericardium) forms later from mesothelial cells of the proepicardium, providing a protective covering for the heart.

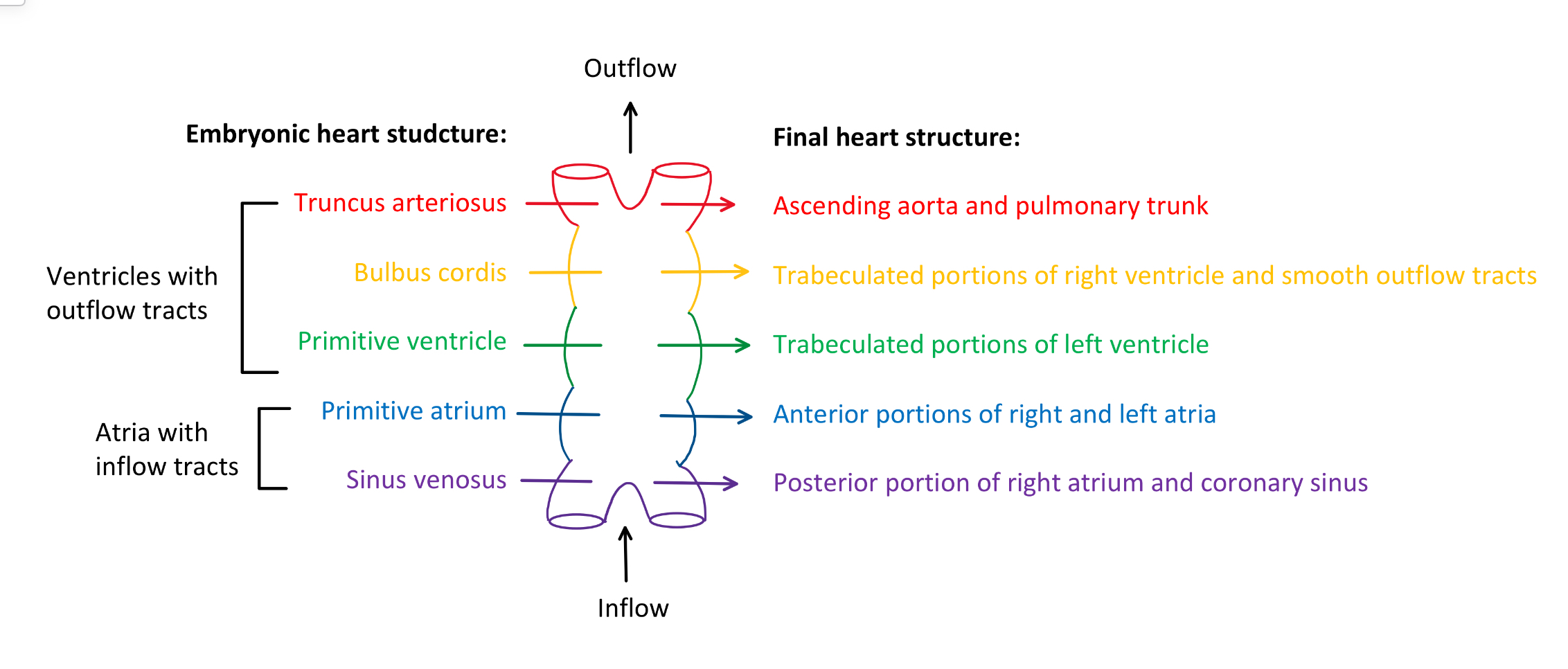
Diagram of tubular heart structures and later fate mapping.

== Structures ==
By day 22, the tubular heart divides into five regions, arranged from inflow to outflow: sinus venosus, primitive atrium, primitive ventricle, bulbus cordis, and truncus arteriosus.

== Fate mapping ==
The five regions later give rise to chambers and great vessels of the mature heart. The sinus venosus will become posterior part of the right atrium with the primary cardiac pacemaker sinoatrial node from its right horn, and the coronary sinus from the left horn. The primitive atrium will develop into the rough anterior walls of both right and left atria. The primitive ventricle will develop into the trabeculated part of the left ventricle. The bulbus cordis will elongate and form the trabeculated part of the right ventricle and the smooth outflow tracts of both ventricles. The truncus arteriosus will form the pulmonary trunk and ascending aorta that carry blood away from the heart. Blood flow is driven by rhythmic myocardial contractions that propel blood from sinus venosus to truncus arteriosus. This unidirectional flow in the valveless heart is different from the coordinated chamber contractions of the adult heart.

== Cardiac looping ==
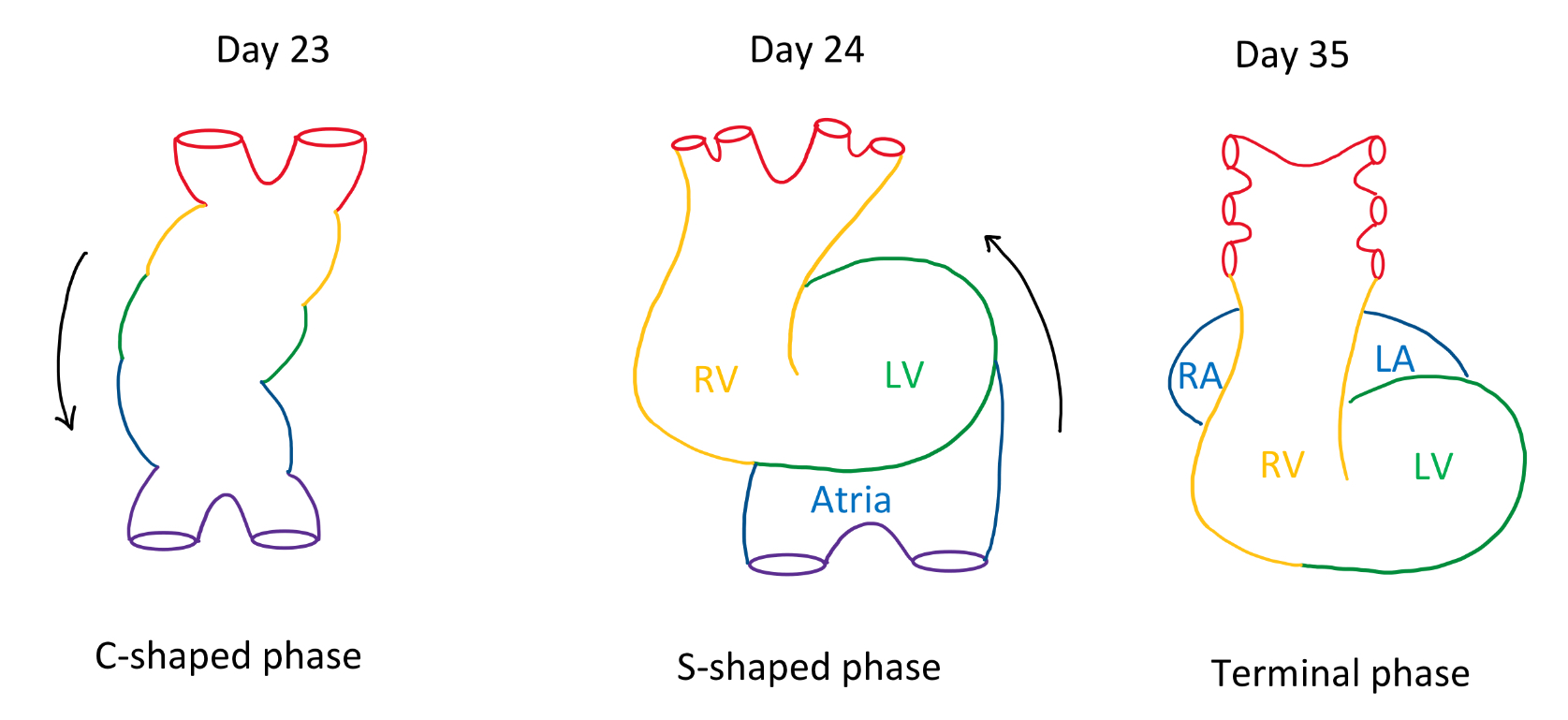
Diagram of human cardiac looping. RV = right ventricle; LV = left ventricle; RA = right atrium; LA = left atrium.

Around day 23, the heart tube begins to elongate and bend, initiating the process of cardiac looping. This process rearranges the regions of the primitive heart tube so that all regions are in the correct positions for features of the mature heart to develop. It occurs in three main phases: the C-shaped, S-shaped and advanced looping stages.

During the C-shaped phase, the initially straight heart tube bends towards the right, forming a loop that marks the beginning of cardiac asymmetry. The middle part becomes the ventricular region, while the arterial end remains relatively straight. Meanwhile, new myocardial cells are added at both ends, causing the tube to elongate and the loop to deepen.

In the subsequent S-shaped phase, the dorsal mesocardium begins to break down, allowing the heart to move freely within the pericardial cavity. This allows for the atrium and inflow tracts to bend dorsally and upwards, while the ventricles and outflow tracts bend ventrally and downwards, producing an S-shaped configuration.

At the advanced looping stage, the primitive atrium moves closer to the head with respect to the primitive ventricle, and the sinus venosus becomes located dorsally to the atria. By the end of looping, all primitive segments of the heart tube are rearranged into the correct positions they will occupy in the mature heart's structure. These segments then continue to remodel, including chamber formation and septation, to produce the fully functional adult heart.

== Gene regulation ==
=== Early stage: left-right patterning ===
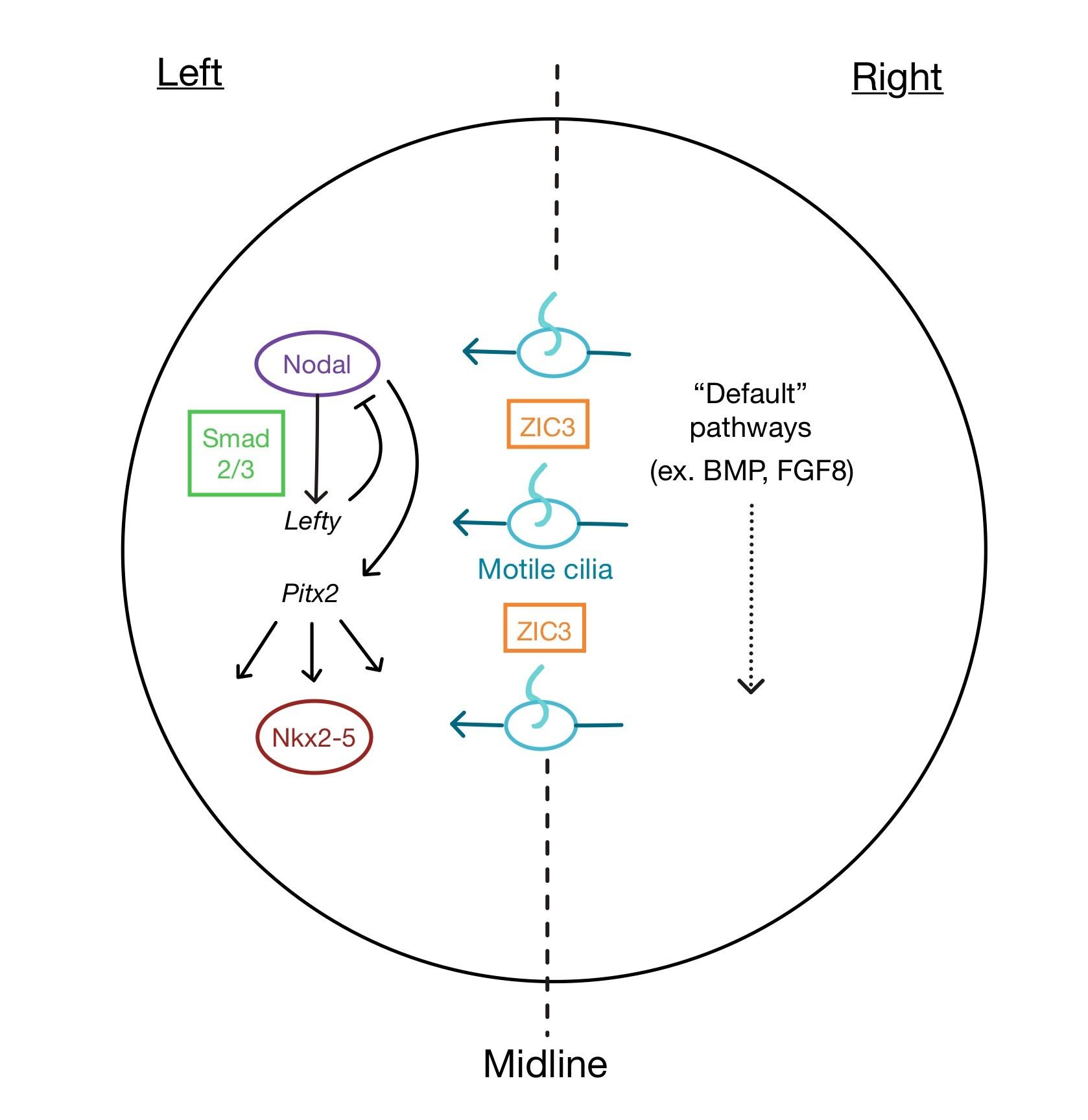
Left-right axis formation and tubular heart development. Structural components (motile cilia), signaling pathways (Nodal), transcription factors (ZIC3, Smad2/3, Nkx2-5), and genes (Lefty, Pitx2) involved in the formation of left-right axis in early embryogenesis

Heart development is largely affected by left-right patterning genes in early embryogenesis. Around gastrulation, the node, a major signalling center, is formed along the midline of the embryo. Once the node is formed, motile cilia begin to rotate, generating a leftward flow of extracellular fluid. This directional flow moves morphogens and signalling factors towards the left side of the embryo, activating the Nodal signalling pathway.

Nodal activates transcription factors Smad 2 and Smad 3, which then activates the gene Lefty. Lefty is a feedback inhibitor of Nodal signalling, as it inhibits Nodal once transcribed. Nodal is a self-enhancing signalling molecule, meaning its transcription binds to its own receptors to create a positive feedback loop. Lefty prevents Nodal signalling from spreading beyond the midline by diffusing faster than Nodal and inhibiting its transcription.

Another mechanism to ensure Nodal signalling remains localized to the left side of the embryo is ZIC3, a transcription factor present at the midline of the embryo, acting as a midline barrier by activating genes such as Lefty1 that suppress Nodal signalling. Together, Lefty and ZIC3 ensure localization of nodal signalling. By day 19 of development, Nodal activates pitx2 on the left side of the embryo.

=== Late stage: Heart morphogenesis ===
Pitx2 activates or represses multiple downstream genes and transcription factors in precursor cells of the left heart field, affecting heart development. One example includes the transcription factor Nkx2-5, which Pitx2 regulates through methods such as chromatin remodelling or through intermediate transcription factors. Nkx2-5 contributes to proper curvature and positioning of atria and ventricles, as well as regulating genes involved in atrioventricular node and bundle formation. Nkx2-5 is one of the key transcription factors necessary in heart development, and is most commonly found to be mutated in patients with congenital heart disorders.

Other downstream effectors of pitx2 are involved in cytoskeletal organization, cell polarity and extracellular matrix remodeling, and various signalling pathways such as Wnt. Because these specific genes are only activated on the left side of the embryo, cells on the left side of the heart proliferate, elongate, and curve differently in comparison to cells on the right side. Pitx2 not only activates left-specific genes, but suppresses signalling pathways that are dominant on the right side of the embryo, such as BMP and FGF8. Overall, the differential gene expression patterns across the left-right axis caused by pitx2 affects cardiac looping, signalling the tubular heart to twist rightward (D-looping).

== Developmental defects during tubular heart stage ==
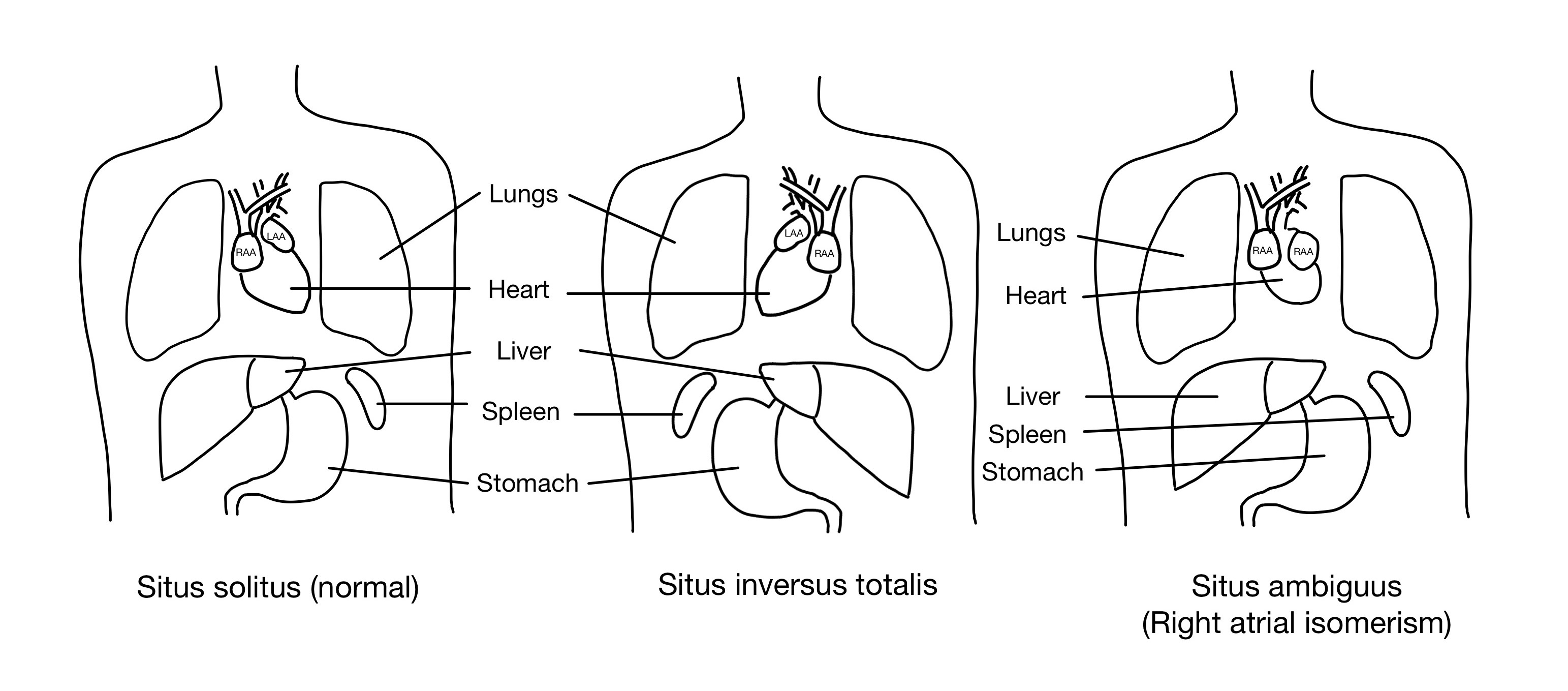
Comparative diagram of situs solitus (normal), situs inversus totalis, and situs ambiguus. Right atrial isomerism is a specific subtype of situs ambiguus, used here to demonstrate an example of what situs ambiguus can look like. RAA = right atrial appendage; LAA = left atrial appendage

Dysregulations during the tubular heart stage can lead to various congenital heart defects (CHDs). Despite being the most common type of birth defect, occurring in 1% of all live births, in most cases, the exact genetic or environmental cause of CHDs are yet to be fully understood. However, human genome research and research using animal models such as mice and zebrafish have advanced our understanding of the genetic contributors of CHDs.

Situs inversus totalis is a condition where all internal thoracic and abdominal organs are mirrored along the left-right axis. Situs inversus totalis originates early on in embryogenesis during the formation of the left-right axis through nodal flow. Defects in motile cilia or mislocalization of ciliary components can lead to embryonic left side signals being established on the embryonic right, resulting in the complete inversion of internal organs.

Situs ambiguus, also known as heterotaxy, is where internal organs are incompletely mirrored due to inconsistent or patchy disruption of left-right patterning. Abnormal variants of the gene encoding transcription factor ZIC3 is found in many patients with situs ambiguus. Patients with heterotaxy can display a wide range of anatomical defects in cardiovascular structure such as atrial or ventricular septal defect and conotruncal or vessel anomalies. Consistent with the high mutation rate of ZIC3 in heterotaxy patients, mutant mice lacking ZIC3 display heterotaxy-like symptoms, such as dextro-transposition of the great arteries and an interrupted aortic arch.

Missense or truncating variants of the gene encoding transcription factor Nkx2-5 has been repeatedly identified in patients with congenital heart defects, specifically in patients with atrial septal defect (ASD) and ventricle septal defect (VSD). Nkx2-5 regulates genes that are required to form the primitive atrial and ventricular septa, where abnormal variants of Nkx2-5 lead to incomplete septal tissue formation and persistent inter-atrial or inter-ventricular opening.

Incorrect looping during the tubular heart stage where the heart undergoes L-looping instead of D-looping leads to an extremely rare type of CHD called Isolated Ventricular Inversion. Isolated Ventricular Inversion has fewer than 20 cases reported in total. This condition is extremely rare because in most cases where the developing heart undergoes L-looping, the outflow tract also becomes transposed (parallel septation) to allow for functional circulation.

=== Case study ===
Heterotaxy syndrome is more frequent in Asian populations in comparison to that of North America and Europe. Prevalence of heterotaxy among patients undergoing a specific heart procedure (the Fontan procedure) was 20-22% in studies conducted in Korea and Japan, while in the US and Australia it was only 7-8%.

Situs inversus totalis is often asymptomatic because while all visceral organs are mirrored, its relative position to one another and anatomical connections remain correct. Situs inversus totalis was incidentally discovered in a 72-year old female who underwent imaging for hematuria (blood in urine). A CT scan revealed that she had complete inversion of all major visceral organs. The hematuria was unrelated to situs inversus totalis and was caused by a bladder tumor. 50-90% of patients with heterotaxy have congenital heart defects depending on the subtype, but only 3-5% of patients with situs inversus totalis have congenital heart defects.
