= 22q11.2 duplication syndrome =

- Specialty: Medical genetics

22q11.2 duplication syndrome is a rare genetic disorder caused by a duplication of a segment at the centromeric end of the long arm of chromosome 22.

== Presentation ==
The most frequent reported symptoms in patients with 22q11.2 duplication syndrome are intellectual disability/learning disability (97% of patients), delayed psychomotor development (67% of patients), growth retardation (63% of patients) and muscular hypotonia (43% of patients). However, these are common and relatively non-specific indications for cytogenetic analysis, and the extent to which the duplication of 22q11.2 causes these features is currently unknown. The duplication is frequently inherited from a normal parent, so it is clear that intellectual development can be normal.

== Genetics ==
Duplications of 22q11 vary in size and thereby in gene content. They include the typical common 3-Mb microduplication, 1.5-Mb nested duplication, consistent with non-allelic homologous recombination (NAHR) using distinct low-copy repeats. These microduplications likely represent the predicted reciprocal rearrangements to the microdeletions characterized in the 22q11.2 region. Smaller microduplications may occur within this highly dynamic with frequent rearrangements using alternative low-copy repeats as recombination substrates within and distal to the DiGeorge syndrome region.

=== Origin of duplication ===
The majority of 22q11 duplications are inherited often from a parent with a normal or near-normal phenotype. This is in sharp distinction to 22q11 deletion syndrome where about 90% of cases are caused by mutations that occur de novo.
