= Recurrent metabolic encephalomyopathic crises-rhabdomyolysis-cardiac arrhythmia-intellectual disability syndrome =

- Other names: TANGO2 Deficiency Disorder, TANGO2-Related Metabolic Encephalopathy and Arrhythmias, MECRCN, Metabolic encephalomyopathic crises, recurrent, with rhabdomyolysis, cardiac arrhythmias, and neurodegeneration.
- This disorder is inherited in Autosomal recessive fashion.
- Specialty: Medical genetics, Neurology, Cardiology
- Usual onset: Infancy
- Causes: Mutations in a gene TANGO2
- Frequency: 1/1 000 000 births

Recurrent metabolic encephalomyopathic crises-rhabdomyolysis-cardiac arrhythmia-intellectual disability syndrome (sometimes referred to as TANGO2 Deficiency) is a rare metabolic and genetic disorder which is caused by mutation in a gene TANGO2. Main signs of this disorder are: Intellectual disability, ataxia, underactive thyroid, and life-threatening episodes of metabolic and cardiac crises, rhabdomyolysis.

The syndrome affects about 1/1 000 000 births, with about 110 cases having been reported worldwide (at the time of articles publication as February 28, 2025).

== Symptoms ==
Symptoms of this disorder might include:

Very frequent:

- Abnormal ECG
- Elevated blood creatine phosphokinase
- Global developmental delay
- Intellectual disability
- Ketone bodies in urine
- Abnormally increased level of blood lactate

Frequent:

- Extrapyramidal signs
- Rhabdomyolysis, acute
- Ataxia
- Irregular heart beat
- Mild hypothyroidism
- Loss of milestones
- Delayed speech and language acquisition
- Delayed walking
- Abnormal liver enzymes
- Gastrointestinal dysmotility
- Generalised brain atrophy
- High blood ammonia levels
- Low blood sugar
- Involuntary muscle contractions
- Increased lactate in body
- Prolonged QT interval
- Seizure

Occasional:

- Lazy eye
- Positive Babinski sign
- Generalised convulsion
- Cortical visual impairment
- Involuntary rhythmic muscular contractions and relaxations
- Swallowing difficulties
- Dystonic movements
- Elevated plasma acylcarnitine levels
- Increased deep tendon reflexes
- Increased muscle tone
- Infantile spasms
- Involuntary, rapid, rhythmic eye movements
- Optic-nerve degeneration
- Stroke
- Supranuclear gaze paralysis

Very rare:

- Decreased size of head
- Sensorineural deafness

Also, most of the patients experience so called "TANGO2 spells", which include episodes of difficulty in maintaining the position of the head, salivation, exhaustion, and decreased alertness and it can be triggered by fasting, dehydration, exposure to excessive heat, infections, and ketogenic diet.

== Cause ==
This disorder is caused by a mutation in a gene, TANGO2, which codes for protein Transport and golgi organization 2 homolog, and its located on chromosome 22. According to one study, exons 3-9 are frequently deleted in people of European origin and Hispanic ethnicity, although in Hispanic ethnicity c.460G>A (which is expressed as p.Gly154Arg, which means that on position 154, glycine is changed to arginine) is also frequent.

Also, people with 22q11.2DS (DiGeorge syndrome) are at risk of developing this disorder because of hemizygosity (which means that they express only one copy of that gene, consequently chances of getting this disorder is higher).

== Pathophysiology ==
TANGO2 plays role in mitochondrial β-oxidation, consequently in that disease, β-oxidation and ATP levels are reduced (especially under stress). Interestingly TANGO2 also might participate in retrograde ER-Golgi trafficking, consequently this process is slowed down in this disease, and the supplementation of TANGO2 has restored that process.

According to one study, TANGO2 also might participate in autophagy process, which might be responsible for rhabdomyolysis in this disease.

== Diagnosis ==
This disorder can be suspected by symptoms, although diagnosis can be confirmed by a genetic testing. Also, diagnosis is usually made after first episode of life-threatening symptoms (such as arrhythmia).

== Treatment ==
This disease doesn't have a cure. Although symptom management is available, and this might include:

1. Supplementation of all B vitamins, such as B5 and B9, because they might alleviate some of the symptoms (such as arrhythmia).
2. Levothyroxine for Hypothyroidism
3. Supportive treatment for developmental delays
4. Antiseizure medication

== Prognosis ==
Life expectancy is limited because the risk of fatal arrhythmia is unpredictable and according to one study median age of death was 6.5 years old.

== History ==
Recurrent metabolic encephalomyopathic crises-rhabdomyolysis-cardiac arrhythmia-intellectual disability syndrome was first identified in 2016.
