= Common iliac artery =

Artery in the abdomen

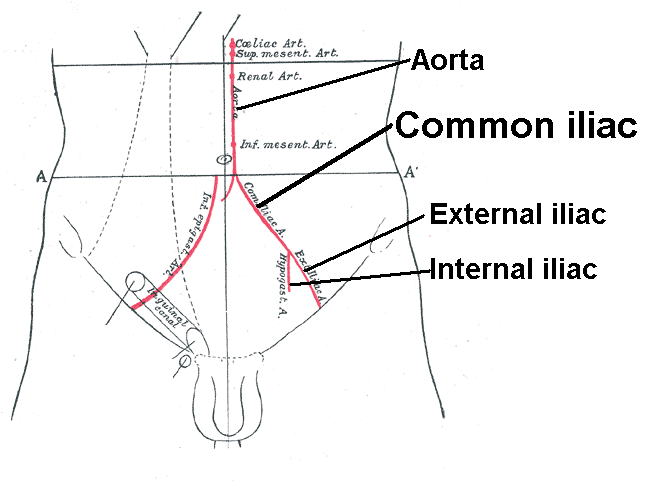
- Front of abdomen, showing surface markings for arteries and inguinal canal.

- Volume rendered CT scan of abdominal and pelvic blood vessels.

Details
- Source: Abdominal aorta
- Branches: External iliac internal iliac
- Vein: Common iliac veins

Identifiers
- Latin: arteria iliaca communis
- TA98: A12.2.14.001
- TA2: 4301
- FMA: 14764

The common iliac artery is a large artery of the abdomen paired on each side. It originates from the aortic bifurcation at the level of the 4th lumbar vertebra. It ends in front of the sacroiliac joint, one on either side, and each bifurcates into the external and internal iliac arteries.

== Structure ==
The common iliac artery are about 4 cm long in adults and more than a centimeter in diameter. It begins as a branch of the aorta. This is at the level of the fourth lumbar vertebra. It runs inferolaterally, along the medial border of the psoas muscles. It bifurcates into the external iliac artery and the internal iliac artery at the pelvic brim, in front of the sacroiliac joints.

The common iliac artery, and all of its branches, exist as paired structures (that is to say, there is one on the left side and one on the right).

The distribution of the common iliac artery is basically the pelvis and lower limb (as the femoral artery) on the corresponding side.

=== Relations ===
Both common iliac arteries are accompanied along their course by the two common iliac veins, which lie posteriorly and to the right. Their terminal bifurcation is crossed anteriorly by the ureters. This is significant, as the bifurcation of the common iliac artery is the second point of ureteric constriction.

== Function ==
The common iliac artery supplies the leg and the pelvic region.

== Clinical significance ==
=== Constriction ===
The common iliac artery may become narrowed. This is most common at the aortic bifurcation.

=== Dilatation ===
Dilatation of the common iliac artery can be graded into the following categories:

Normal	Diameter ≤ 12 mm
Ectasia	Diameter 12 to 18 mm
Aneurysm	Diameter ≥ 18 mm

== Additional images ==
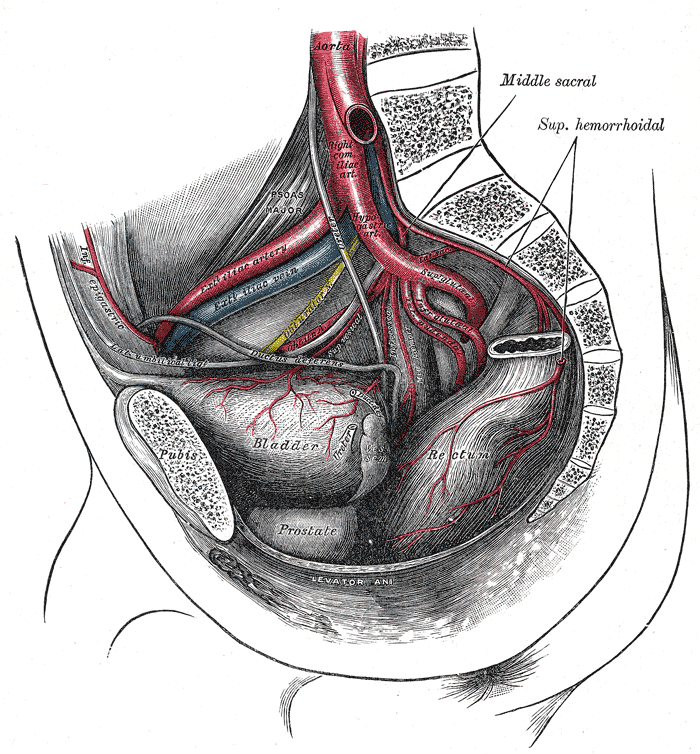
Bifurcation of the aorta and the right common iliac artery - side view. Hypogastric artery is an old term for internal iliac artery. (Com. iliac. a. is visible at center bottom left.)

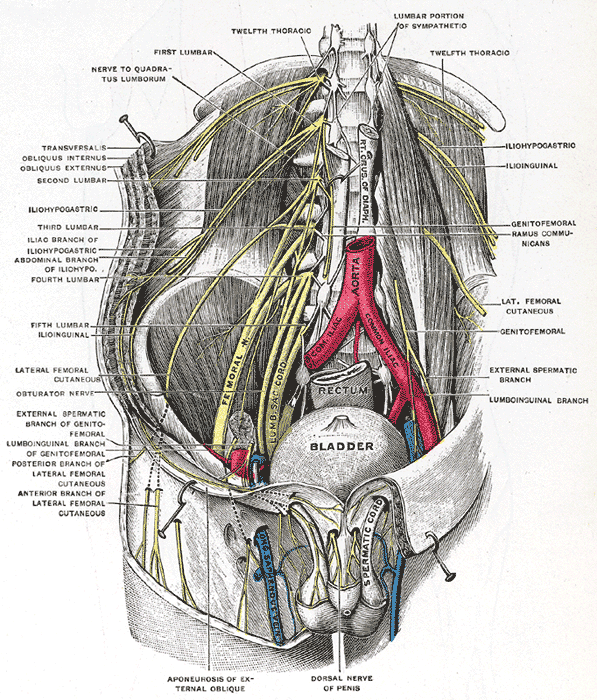
Deep and superficial dissection of the lumbar plexus.

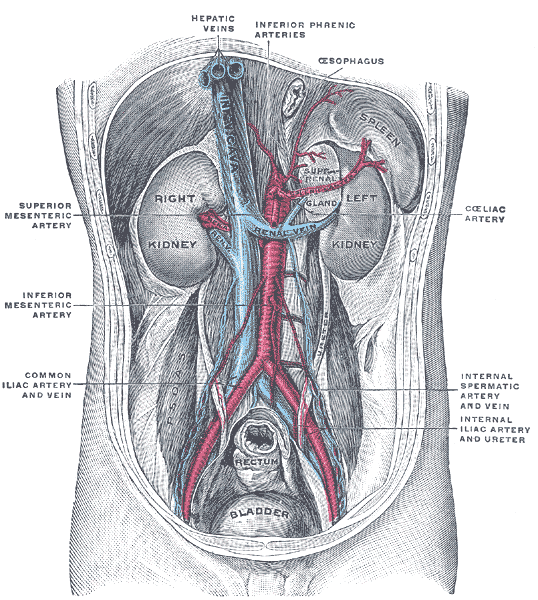
Posterior abdominal wall, after removal of the peritoneum, showing kidneys, suprarenal capsules, and great vessels.

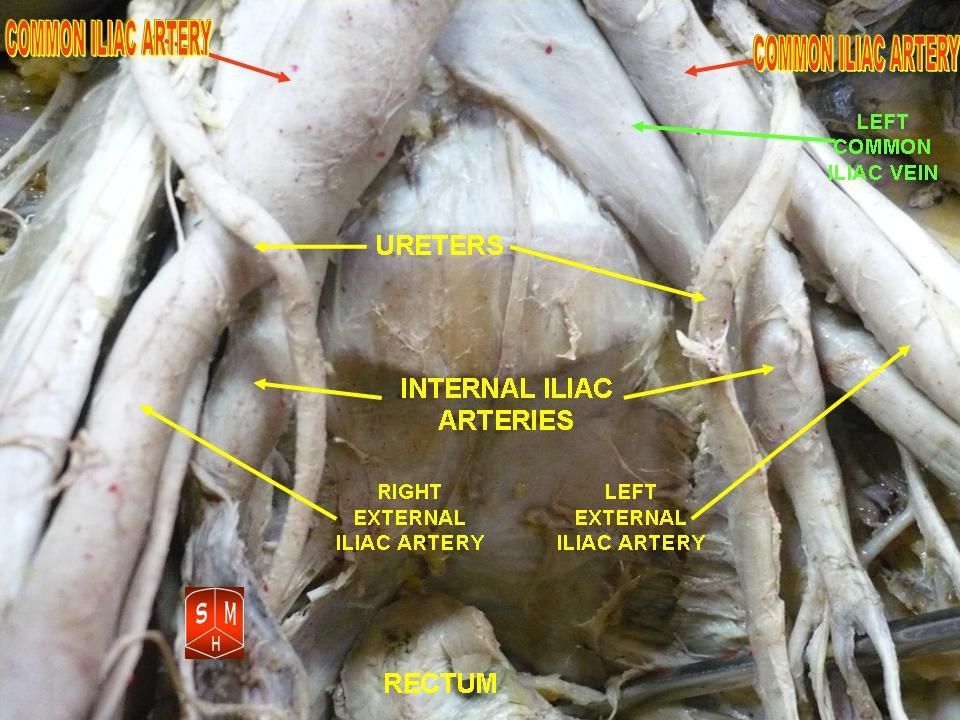
Common iliac arteries
