= Aorticopulmonary septum =

Anatomical entity

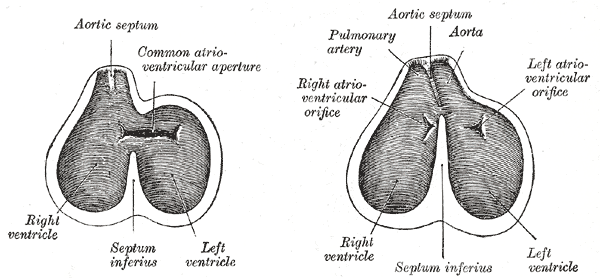
- Diagrams to show the development of the septum of the aortic bulb and of the ventricles.

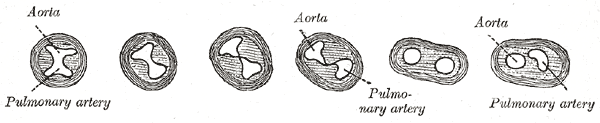
- Transverse sections through the aortic bulb to show the growth of the aortic septum. The lowest section is on the left, the highest on the right of the figure.

Details
- Days: 37
- Precursor: neural crest

Identifiers
- Latin: septum aorticopulmonale
- TE: septum_by_E4.0.3.5.0.3.12 E4.0.3.5.0.3.12

The aorticopulmonary septum is developmentally formed from neural crest, specifically the cardiac neural crest, and actively separates the aorta and pulmonary arteries and fuses with the interventricular septum within the heart during heart development.

== Structure ==
In the developing heart, the truncus arteriosus and bulbus cordis are divided by the aortic septum. This makes its appearance in three portions.

1. Two distal ridge-like thickenings project into the lumen of the tube; these increase in size, and ultimately meet and fuse to form a septum, which takes a spiral course toward the proximal end of the truncus arteriosus. It divides the distal part of the truncus into two vessels, the aorta and pulmonary artery, which lie side by side above, but near the heart the pulmonary artery is in front of the aorta.
2. Four endocardial cushions appear in the proximal part of the truncus arteriosus in the region of the future semilunar valves; the manner in which these are related to the aortic septum is described below.
3. Two endocardial thickenings—anterior and posterior—develop in the bulbus cordis and unite to form a short septum; this joins above with the aortic septum and below with the ventricular septum. The septum grows down into the ventricle as an oblique partition, which ultimately blends with the ventricular septum in such a way as to bring the bulbus cordis into communication with the pulmonary artery, and through the latter with the sixth pair of aortic arches; while the left ventricle is brought into continuity with the aorta, which communicates with the remaining aortic arches.

== Clinical significance ==
The actual mechanism of septation of the outflow tract is poorly understood, but is recognized as a dynamic process with contributions from contractile, hemodynamic, and extracellular matrix interactions. Misalignment of the septum can cause the congenital heart conditions tetralogy of Fallot, persistent truncus arteriosus, dextro-Transposition of the great arteries, tricuspid atresia, and anomalous pulmonary venous connection.

== See also ==
- Aortopulmonary septal defect
