= HIST1H2BK =

Protein-coding gene in the species Homo sapiens

H2BC12

Identifiers
- Aliases: H2BC12, H2B/S, H2BFAiii, H2BFT, H2BK, histone cluster 1, H2bk, histone cluster 1 H2B family member k, H2B clustered histone 12, HIST1H2BK
- External IDs: OMIM: 615045; MGI: 2448399; GeneCards: H2BC12
Available structures
| PDB | Ortholog search: PDBe RCSB |
| PDB | List of PDB id codes 2CV5 |

Gene location (Human)
| Chr. | Chromosome 6 (human) |
| Band | 6p22.1 | Start | 27,146,361 bp |
| Band | 6p22.1 | End | 27,146,855 bp |

Gene location (Mouse)
| Chr. | Chromosome 13 (mouse) |
| Band | 13|13 A3.1 | Start | 22,220,040 bp |
| Band | 13|13 A3.1 | End | 22,220,515 bp |
RNA expression pattern
| Bgee | Human / Mouse (ortholog); Top expressed in: bone marrow cell; monocyte; blood; Achilles tendon; placenta; mucosa of transverse colon; spleen; gonad; prostate; fallopian tube / Top expressed in: uterus; zygote; secondary oocyte; primary oocyte; white adipose tissue; bone marrow; adrenal gland; spermatid; urinary bladder; embryo; More reference expression data |
| BioGPS | n/a |
Gene ontology
| Molecular function | DNA binding; protein heterodimerization activity; molecular function |
| Cellular component | nucleoplasm; nucleosome; nucleus; chromosome; extracellular space; cytosol |
| Biological process | nucleosome assembly; innate immune response in mucosa; defense response to bacterium; protein ubiquitination; antimicrobial humoral immune response mediated by antimicrobial peptide |
Sources:Amigo / QuickGO
Orthologs
| Databases | NCBI: entry; OMA: entry |
| Species | Human | Mouse |
| Entrez | 85236 | 319184 |
| Ensembl | ENSG00000197903 | ENSMUSG00000062727 |
| UniProt | O60814 | Q8CGP1 |
| RefSeq (mRNA) | NM_080593; NM_001312653 | NM_175665 |
| RefSeq (protein) | NP_001299582; NP_542160 | NP_783596 |
| Location (UCSC) | Chr 6: 27.15 – 27.15 Mb | Chr 13: 22.22 – 22.22 Mb |
| PubMed search |
- Wikidata
| View/Edit Human | View/Edit Mouse |

Histone H2B type 1-K is a protein that in humans is encoded by the HIST1H2BK gene.

Histones are basic nuclear proteins that are responsible for the nucleosome structure of the chromosomal fiber in eukaryotes. Two molecules of each of the four core histones (H2A, H2B, H3, and H4) form an octamer, around which approximately 146 bp of DNA is wrapped in repeating units, called nucleosomes. The linker histone, H1, interacts with linker DNA between nucleosomes and functions in the compaction of chromatin into higher order structures. This gene encodes a member of the histone H2B family. This gene is found in the histone microcluster on chromosome 6p21.33.

== Interactions ==
HIST1H2BK has been shown to interact with HIRA.
