= DGCR2 =

Protein-coding gene in the species Homo sapiens

Identifiers
- Aliases: DGCR2, DGS-C, IDD, LAN, SEZ-12, 9930034O06Rik, Dgsc, Sez12, mKIAA0163, DiGeorge syndrome critical region gene 2
- External IDs: OMIM: 600594; MGI: 892866; GeneCards: DGCR2

Gene location (Human)
Chr.	Chromosome 22 (human)
Band	22q11.21	Start	19,036,282 bp
Band	22q11.21	End	19,122,454 bp

Gene location (Mouse)
Chr.	Chromosome 16 (mouse)
Band	16 A3|16 11.05 cM	Start	17,657,346 bp
Band	16 A3|16 11.05 cM	End	17,716,426 bp
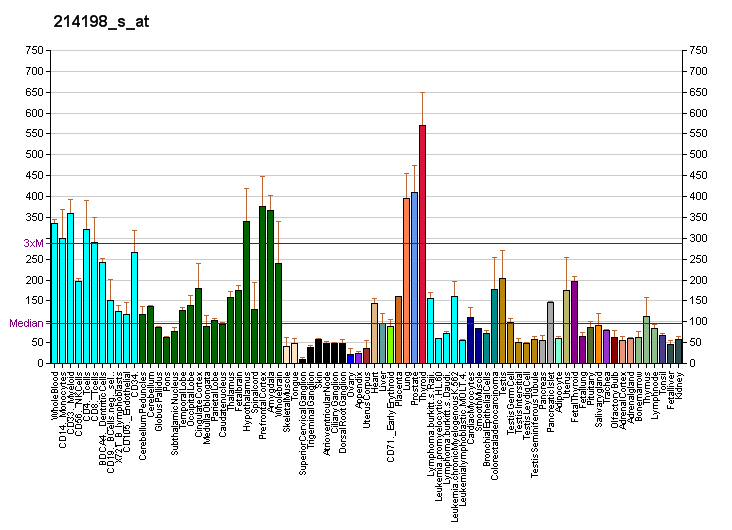

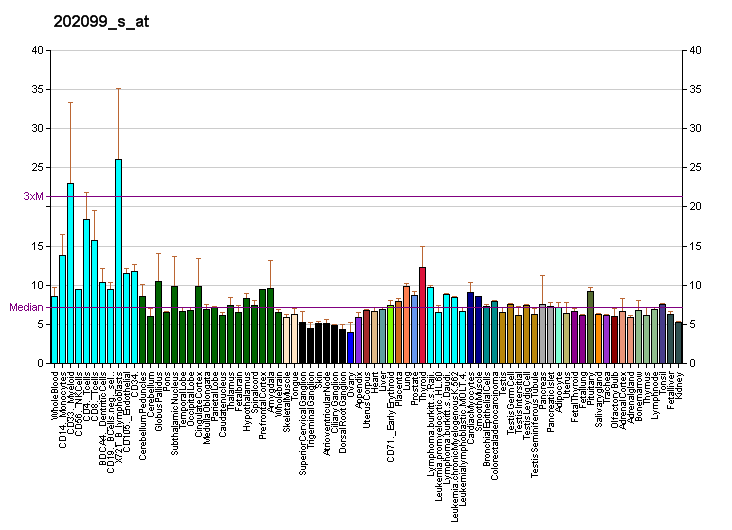
RNA expression pattern
Bgee	Human / Mouse (ortholog); Top expressed in: human penis; nipple; external globus pallidus; lateral nuclear group of thalamus; ventral tegmental area; parotid gland; superior vestibular nucleus; hair follicle; pons; pars reticulata / Top expressed in: spermatid; corneal stroma; ventricular zone; lacrimal gland; dentate gyrus of hippocampal formation granule cell; molar; cerebellar cortex; lip; primary visual cortex; dorsomedial hypothalamic nucleus; More reference expression data
BioGPS	More reference expression data
Gene ontology
Molecular function	carbohydrate binding
Cellular component	integral component of membrane; membrane
Biological process	animal organ morphogenesis; cell adhesion; cognition
Sources:Amigo / QuickGO
Orthologs
Databases	NCBI: entry; OMA: entry
Species	Human	Mouse
Entrez	9993	13356
Ensembl	ENSG00000070413	ENSMUSG00000003166
UniProt	P98153	P98154
RefSeq (mRNA)	NM_001173533; NM_001173534; NM_001184781; NM_005137	NM_001109750; NM_010048
RefSeq (protein)	NP_001167004; NP_001167005; NP_001171710; NP_005128	NP_001103220; NP_034178
Location (UCSC)	Chr 22: 19.04 – 19.12 Mb	Chr 16: 17.66 – 17.72 Mb
PubMed search
- Wikidata
View/Edit Human	View/Edit Mouse

The DGCR2 gene encodes the protein integral membrane protein DGCR2/IDD in humans.

Deletions of the 22q11.2 have been associated with a wide range of developmental defects (notably DiGeorge syndrome, velocardiofacial syndrome, conotruncal anomaly face syndrome and isolated conotruncal cardiac defects) classified under the acronym CATCH 22. The DGCR2 gene encodes a novel putative adhesion receptor protein, which could play a role in neural crest cells migration, a process which has been proposed to be altered in DiGeorge syndrome. DGCR2 is thought to interact with the Reelin complex to regulate corticogenesis.
