= Asymmetric crying facies =

- Other names: Cayler cardiofacial syndrome; partial unilateral facial paresis; hypoplasia of depressor angula oris muscle
- Specialty: Medical genetics

Asymmetric crying facies (ACF), also called Cayler cardiofacial syndrome, partial unilateral facial paresis and hypoplasia of depressor angula oris muscle, is a minor congenital anomaly caused by agenesis or hypoplasia of the depressor anguli oris muscle, one of the muscles that control the movements of the lower lip. This unilateral facial weakness is first noticed when the infant cries or smiles, affecting only one corner of the mouth and occurs on the left side in nearly 80% of cases.

When the hypoplasia of the depressor anguli oris muscle is associated with congenital cardiac defects, the term 'Cayler cardiofacial syndrome' is used. Cayler syndrome is part of 22q11.2 deletion syndrome. It was characterized by Cayler in 1969.
