= Stella Van Praagh =

Pediatric cardiologist and pathologist

- Born: Stella Zacharioudaki; March 18, 1927; Rethymnon, Greece
- Died: June 3, 2006 (aged 79)
- Education: University of Athens, Johns Hopkins
- Years active: 1952-2002
- Medical career
- Profession: Pediatric Cardiologist
- Field: Pediatric Cardiology, Pathology
- Institutions: Children's Hospital of Buffalo, Children's Hospital Boston

Stella Van Praagh was a pediatric cardiologist and pathologist at Children's Hospital Boston. She was internationally known for her contributions to the pathology of congenital heart disease.

== Early life ==
Stella Van Praagh was born in Rethymnon, Crete, Greece. She graduated from the School of Medicine at the University of Athens in 1952 and undertook further training in pediatric cardiology at Johns Hopkins where she worked with Helen Taussig.

== Career ==
In 1962, she moved to Children's Hospital of Buffalo as a pediatric cardiologist and research associate. There, she met Richard Van Praagh, and the two were married shortly afterwards, beginning a lifelong personal and professional partnership. In 1965, both Van Praaghs moved to Boston Children's Hospital where they worked until their retirements in 2002.

== Accomplishments ==
Stella and Richard Van Praagh were world-renowned pediatric cardiologists and pathologists. They proposed a new approach to formalize anatomic descriptions of congenital heart disease, which forms the basis of much of the current standard understanding. Specific examples include Truncus Arteriosus, sinus venosus atrial septal defect, and heterotaxy syndrome.

=== Awards ===
- Society for Cardiovascular Pathology Distinguished Achievement Award, 1999
- American Heart Association Paul Dudley White Award, 2004
