= HIRA =

Human gene and protein

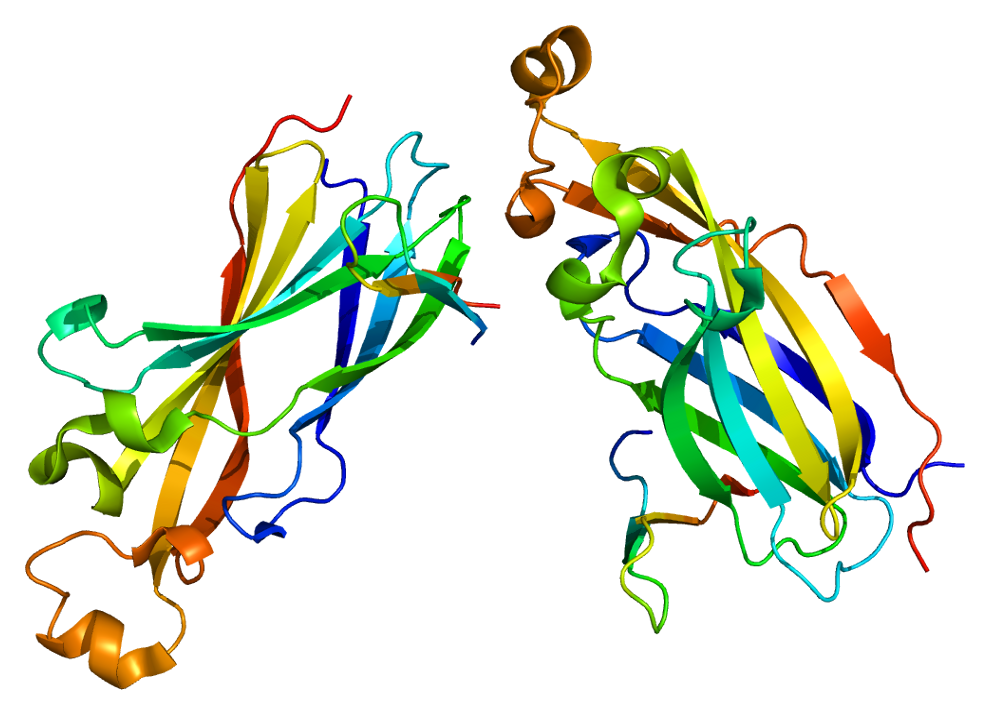

Identifiers
- Aliases: HIRA, DGCR1, TUP1, TUPLE1, histone cell cycle regulator
- External IDs: OMIM: 600237; MGI: 99430; GeneCards: HIRA
Available structures
| PDB | Ortholog search: PDBe RCSB |
| PDB | List of PDB id codes 2I32 |

Gene location (Human)
| Chr. | Chromosome 22 (human) |
| Band | 22q11.21 | Start | 19,330,698 bp |
| Band | 22q11.21 | End | 19,447,450 bp |

Gene location (Mouse)
| Chr. | Chromosome 16 (mouse) |
| Band | 16 A3|16 11.69 cM | Start | 18,695,787 bp |
| Band | 16 A3|16 11.69 cM | End | 18,789,059 bp |
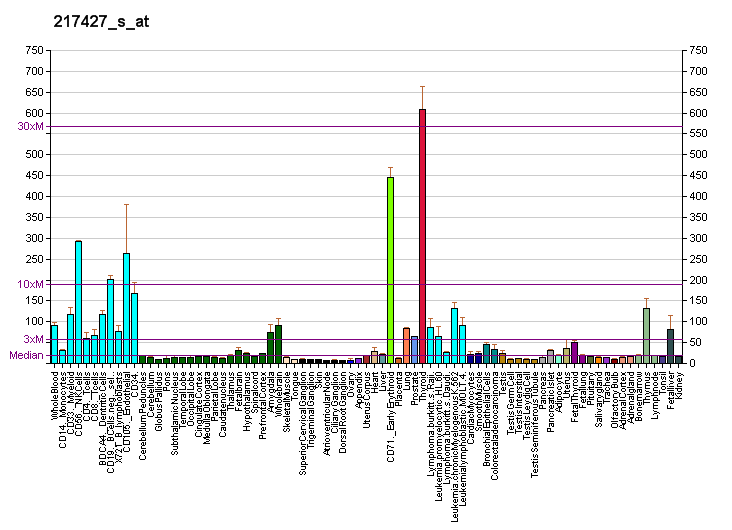
RNA expression pattern
| Bgee | Human / Mouse (ortholog); Top expressed in: left lobe of thyroid gland; right lobe of thyroid gland; granulocyte; ventricular zone; ganglionic eminence; stromal cell of endometrium; gastrocnemius muscle; right frontal lobe; prefrontal cortex; thymus / Top expressed in: ventricular zone; dentate gyrus of hippocampal formation granule cell; neural layer of retina; tail of embryo; superior frontal gyrus; primary visual cortex; genital tubercle; yolk sac; lip; muscle of thigh; More reference expression data |
| BioGPS | More reference expression data |
Gene ontology
| Molecular function | DNA-binding transcription factor activity; protein binding; transcription corepressor activity; nucleosome binding; DNA binding |
| Cellular component | PML body; extracellular exosome; nucleus; nucleoplasm; HIR complex; chromosome, centromeric region; protein-containing complex |
| Biological process | regulation of transcription by RNA polymerase II; muscle cell differentiation; anatomical structure morphogenesis; regulation of transcription, DNA-templated; gastrulation; osteoblast differentiation; transcription, DNA-templated; negative regulation of nucleic acid-templated transcription; chromatin organization; mitotic sister chromatid segregation |
Sources:Amigo / QuickGO
Orthologs
| Databases | NCBI: entry; OMA: entry |
| Species | Human | Mouse |
| Entrez | 7290 | 15260 |
| Ensembl | ENSG00000100084 | ENSMUSG00000022702 |
| UniProt | P54198 | Q61666 |
| RefSeq (mRNA) | NM_003325 | NM_001005228; NM_010435 |
| RefSeq (protein) | NP_003316 | NP_034565 |
| Location (UCSC) | Chr 22: 19.33 – 19.45 Mb | Chr 16: 18.7 – 18.79 Mb |
| PubMed search |
- Wikidata
| View/Edit Human | View/Edit Mouse |

Protein HIRA is a protein that in humans is encoded by the HIRA gene. This gene is mapped to 22q11.21, centromeric to COMT.

== Function ==
The specific function of this protein has yet to be determined; however, it has been speculated to play a role in transcriptional regulation and/or chromatin and histone metabolism.

Research done by Salomé Adam, Sophie E. Polo, and Geneviève Almouzni indicate that HIRA proteins are involved in restarting transcription after UVC damage. Function of HIRA gene can be effectively examined by siRNA knockdown based on an independent validation.

== Clinical significance ==
It is considered the primary candidate gene in some haploinsufficiency syndromes such as DiGeorge syndrome, and insufficient production of the gene may disrupt normal embryonic development.

== Interactions ==
HIRA has been shown to interact with HIST1H2BK.
