= MiR-338 =

Family of brain-specific microRNA precursors

miR-338
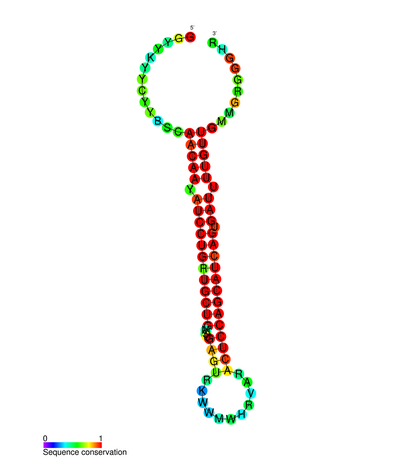
- Conserved secondary structure of miR-338 microRNA precursor

Identifiers
- Symbol: miR-338
- Alt. Symbols: MIR338
- Rfam: RF00686
- miRBase: MI0000814
- miRBase family: MIPF0000097
- NCBI Gene: 442906
- HGNC: 31775
- OMIM: 614059
- RefSeq: NR_029897

Other data
- RNA type: miRNA
- Domain: Mammalia
- GO: 0035195
- SO: 0001244
- Locus: Chr. 17 q25.3
- PDB structures: PDBe

miR-338 is a family of brain-specific microRNA precursors found in mammals, including humans. The ~22 nucleotide mature miRNA sequence is excised from the precursor hairpin by the enzyme Dicer. This sequence then associates with RISC which effects RNA interference.

miR-338 is located in an intronic region within the gene for apoptosis-associated tyrosine kinase (AATK). It has been predicted that it may downregulate genes which have a downstream negative effect on AATK expression.

== Function ==
miR-338 is a brain-specific miRNA which regulates the expression of cytochrome c oxidase IV (COX4). The mature miR-338 miRNA sequence is complementary to a short section of the 3' untranslated region of COX4 mRNA. This mRNA sequence is presented atop a stem-loop structure, indicating it is accessible to miRNA processing.

== Applications ==
miR-338 is dysregulated in neuroblastoma, and could potentially be implemented as a biomarker or future therapeutic agent. miR-338 has also been linked with hepatocellular carcinoma, and a large-scale diagnostic test has been suggested involving measurement of miR-338 expression in tissue samples. Furthermore, miR-338 is one of seven microRNAs whose expression profiles can be combined to give a prediction of the probability of survival of a patient with gastric cancer.
