= Aortic bifurcation =

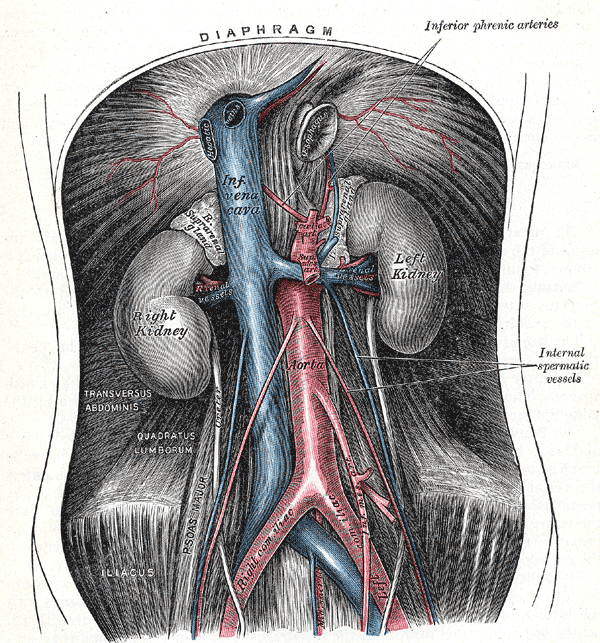
- The abdominal aorta and its bifurcation into the two common iliac arteries (red).

Details
- Source: Abdominal aorta
- Branches: Common iliac arteries
- Vein: Inferior vena cava

Identifiers
- Latin: bifurcatio aortae
- TA98: A12.2.13.001
- TA2: 4297
- FMA: 3795

The aortic bifurcation is the point at which the abdominal aorta bifurcates (forks) into the left and right common iliac arteries. The aortic bifurcation is usually seen at the level of L4, just above the junction of the left and right common iliac veins.

The right common iliac artery passes in front of the left common iliac vein. In some individuals, mainly women with lumbar lordosis, this vein can be compressed between the vertebra and the artery. This is the so-called Cockett syndrome or May–Thurner syndrome can cause a slower venous flow and the possibility of deep venous thrombosis in the left leg mainly in pregnancy.

In surface anatomy, the bifurcation approximately corresponds to the umbilicus.

== Additional images ==
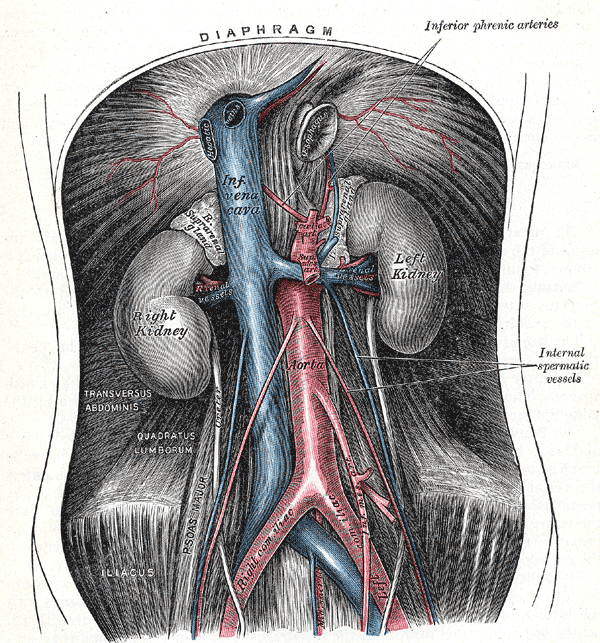
The abdominal aorta and its branches.

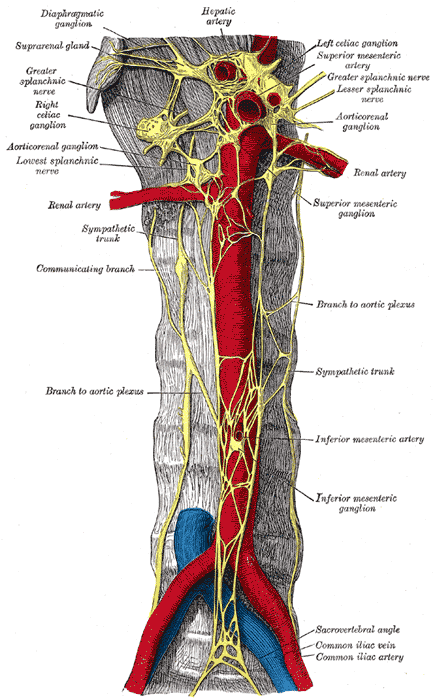
Abdominal portion of the sympathetic trunk, with the celiac and hypogastric plexuses.

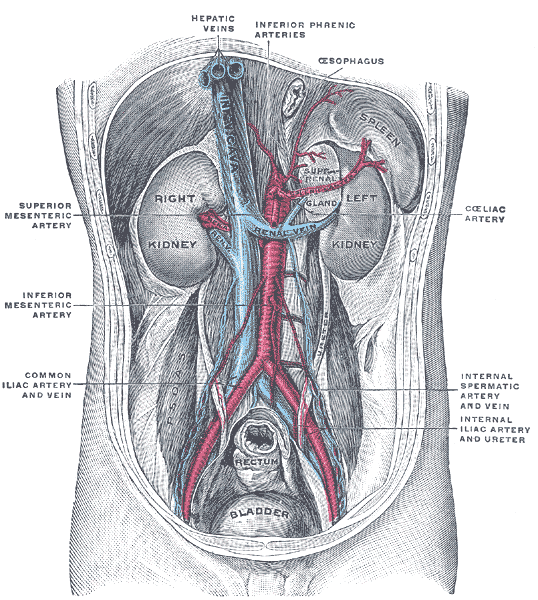
Posterior abdominal wall, after removal of the peritoneum, showing kidneys, supra-renal capsules, and great vessels.
