= Truncus arteriosus =

Structure during embryonic development

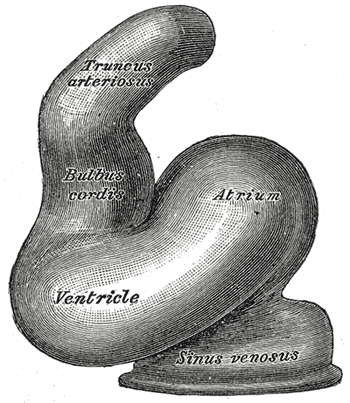
- Heart of human embryo of about twenty-four days. (Truncus arteriosus visible at top.)

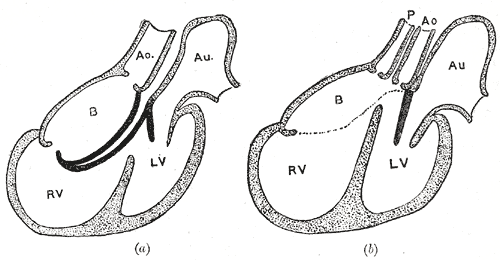
- Diagrams to illustrate the transformation of the bulbus cordis. Ao. Truncus arteriosus. Au. Atrium. B. Bulbus cordis. RV. Right ventricle. LV. Left ventricle. P. Pulmonary artery.

Details
- Precursor: Cardiogenic area
- Gives rise to: Aorta, pulmonary artery
- System: Cardiovascular system

Identifiers
- MeSH: D014338
- TE: arteriosus_by_E5.11.1.8.1.0.4 E5.11.1.8.1.0.4
- FMA: 70301

The truncus arteriosus is a structure that is present during embryonic development. It is an arterial trunk that originates from both ventricles of the heart that later divides into the aorta and the pulmonary trunk.

== Structure ==
The truncus arteriosus and bulbus cordis are divided by the aorticopulmonary septum. The truncus arteriosus gives rise to the ascending aorta and the pulmonary trunk. The caudal end of the bulbus cordis gives rise to the smooth parts (outflow tract) of the left and right ventricles (aortic vestibule & conus arteriosus respectively). The cranial end of the bulbus cordis (also known as the conus cordis) gives rise to the aorta and pulmonary trunk with the truncus arteriosus.

This makes its appearance in three portions.

1. Two distal ridge-like thickenings project into the lumen of the tube: the truncal and bulbar ridges. These increase in size, and ultimately meet and fuse to form a septum (aorticopulmonary septum), which takes a spiral course toward the proximal end of the truncus arteriosus. It divides the distal part of the truncus into two vessels, the aorta and pulmonary artery, which lie side by side above, but near the heart the pulmonary artery is in front of the aorta.
2. Four endocardial cushions appear in the proximal part of the truncus arteriosus in the region of the future semilunar valves; the manner in which these are related to the aortic septum is described below.
3. Two endocardial thickenings—anterior and posterior—develop in the bulbus cordis and unite to form a short septum; this joins above with the aortic septum and below with the ventricular septum. The septum grows down into the ventricle as an oblique partition, which ultimately blends with the ventricular septum in such a way as to bring the bulbus cordis into communication with the pulmonary artery, and through the latter with the sixth pair of aortic arches; while the left ventricle is brought into continuity with the aorta, which communicates with the remaining aortic arches.
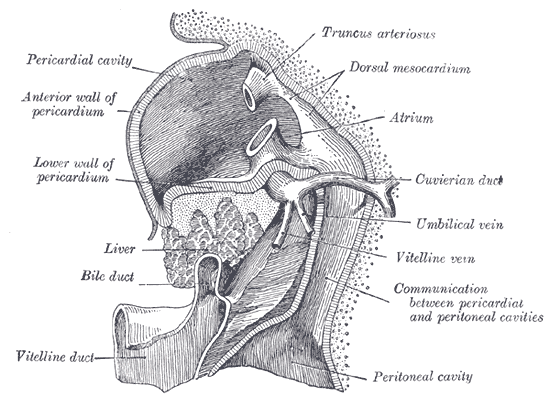
Liver with the septum transversum. Human embryo 3 mm. long.

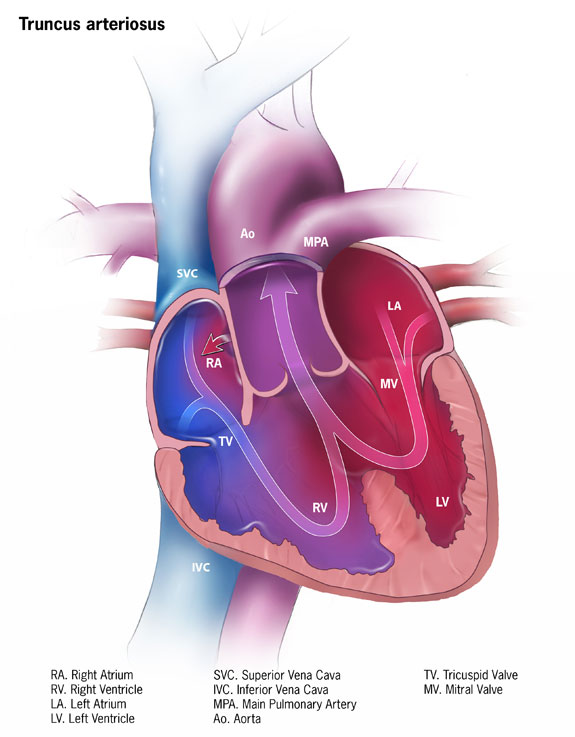
Illustration of truncus arteriosus in a fully formed heart

== Clinical significance ==
Failure of the truncus arteriosus to close results in the condition known as persistent truncus arteriosus, a rare congenital heart defect. This is often just referred to as truncus arteriosus. Echocardiography is used to diagnose this condition. Other pathologies of the truncus arteriosus include transposition of the great vessels (arteries in this case), and tetralogy of Fallot.
