= Great arteries =

Primary arteries leaving the heart

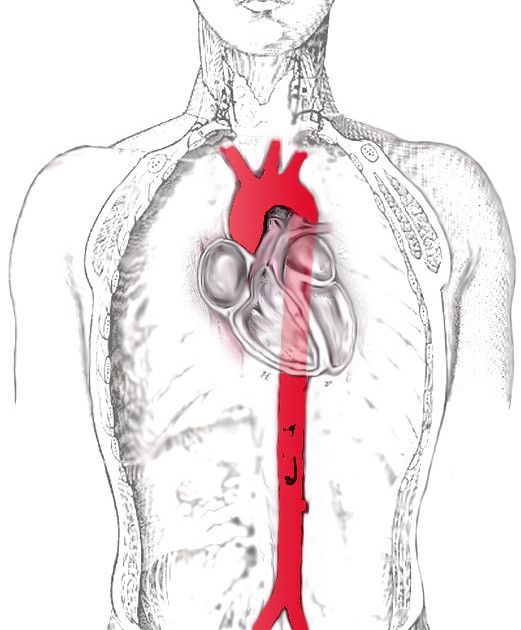
Aorta (Scheme)

The great arteries are the primary arteries that carry blood away from the heart, which include:

- Pulmonary artery: the vessel that carries oxygen-depleted blood from the right ventricle to the lungs.
- Aorta: the blood vessel through which oxygenated blood from the left ventricle enters the systemic circulation.

== Development ==
The great arteries originate from the aortic arches during embryonic development. The aortic arches start as five pairs of symmetrical vessels connecting the heart with the dorsal aorta but then undergo a significant remodelling, in which some of these vessels regress (aortic arches 1 and 2), the 3rd pair of arches contribute to form the common carotids, the right 4th will contribute to the base and central part of the right subclavian artery, while the left 4th will form the central portion of the aortic arch.

The 5th pair of vessels only form in some cases without any known contribution to the final structure of the great arteries.

The right 6th almost completely regresses with only the proximal part contributing to the base of the pulmonary arteries, while the left 6th forms the ductus arteriosus, which disappears after birth.

== Defects in the Great Arteries ==
Abnormalities in the development of the great arteries during embryonic development may lead to congenital cardiovascular defects, such as:

- Interrupted Aortic Arch
- Abnormal Right Subclavian Artery
- Transposition of the great arteries

Some of these defects can be asymptomatic and cause no complications in patients, with others being more severe and require immediate surgery right after birth.
