= Primary interventricular foramen =

Temporary opening in heart development

Details
- Location: Embryonic heart

Identifiers
- Latin: foramen interventriculare primarium
- TE: interventricular foramen_by_E5.11.1.3.2.0.14 E5.11.1.3.2.0.14

In human embryology, the primary interventricular foramen is a temporary opening between the developing ventricles of the heart. The ventricles arise as a single cavity that is divided by the developing interventricular septum. Before the septum closes completely, the remaining opening between the two ventricles is termed the interventricular foramen.

In some individuals, the foramen fails to close, leading to an interventricular septal defect known as a patent interventricular foramen.
