= Bulbus cordis =

Part of the developing heart

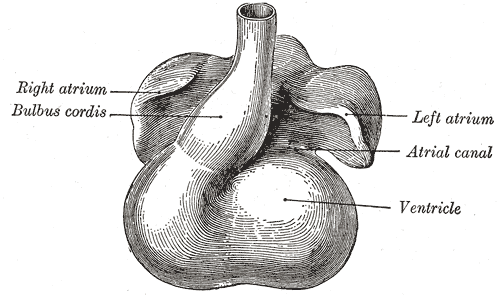
- Heart showing expansion of the atria.

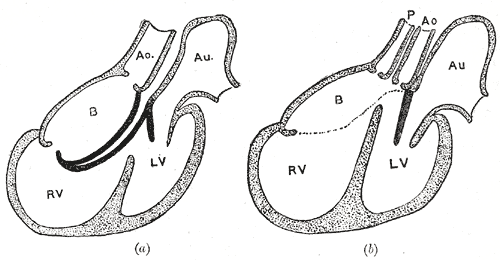
- Diagrams to illustrate the transformation of the bulbus cordis. Ao. Truncus arteriosus. Au. Atrium. B. Bulbus cordis. RV. Right ventricle. LV. Left ventricle. P. Pulmonary artery.

Details
- Carnegie stage: 9
- Gives rise to: smooth parts of right ventricle, left ventricle

Identifiers
- Latin: bulbus cordis

The bulbus cordis (the bulb of the heart) is a part of the developing heart that lies ventral to the primitive ventricle after the heart assumes its S-shaped form. The superior end of the bulbus cordis is also called the conotruncus.

== Structure ==
In the early tubular heart, the bulbus cordis is the major outflow pathway. It receives blood from the primitive ventricle, and passes it to the truncus arteriosus. After heart looping, it is located slightly to the left of the ventricle.

=== Development ===
The early bulbus cordis is formed by the fifth week of development. The truncus arteriosus is derived from it later.

The adjacent walls of the bulbus cordis and ventricle approximate, fuse, and finally disappear, and the bulbus cordis now communicates freely with the right ventricle, while the junction of the bulbus with the truncus arteriosus is brought directly ventral to and applied to the atrial canal.

By the upgrowth of the ventricular septum the bulbus cordis is separated from the left ventricle, but remains an integral part of the right ventricle, of which it forms the infundibulum.

Together, the bulbus cordis and the primitive ventricle give rise to the ventricles of the formed heart.

== Other animals ==
The bulbus cordis is shared in the development of many animals, including frogs and fish.

== Additional images ==
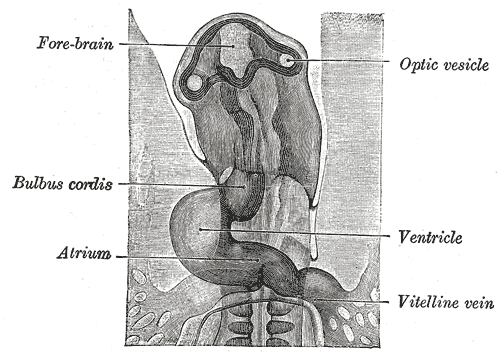
Head of chick embryo of about thirty-eight hours' incubation, viewed from the ventral surface. X 26

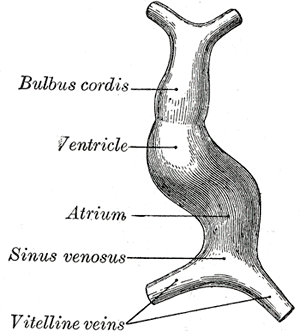
Diagram to illustrate the simple tubular condition of the heart.

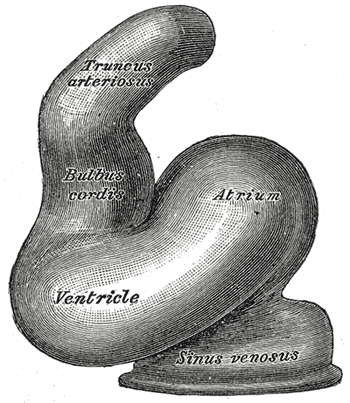
Heart of human embryo of about fourteen days.

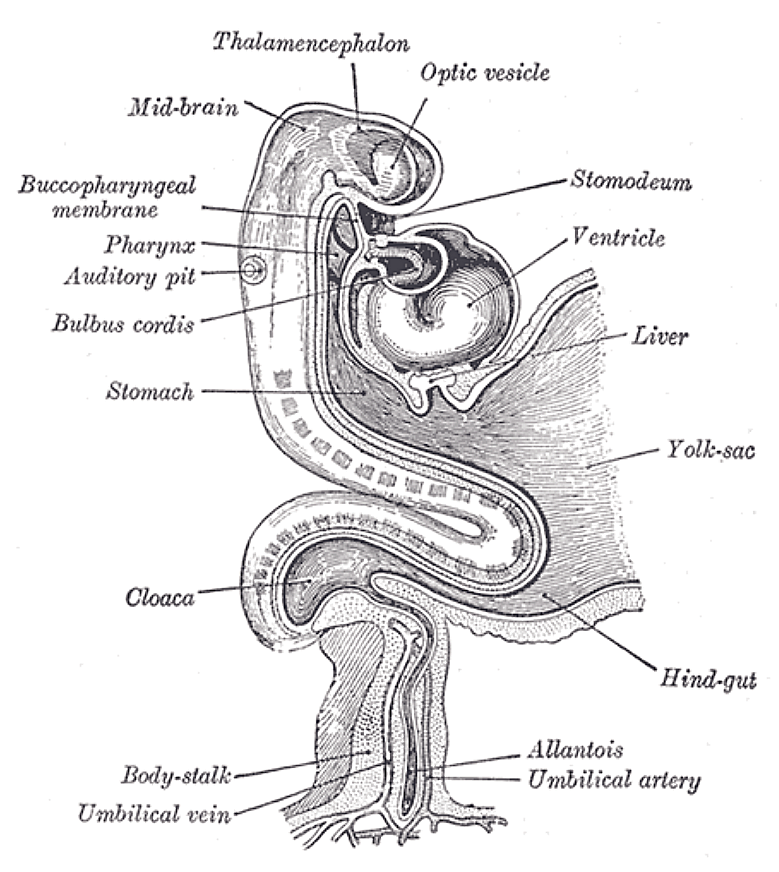
Human embryo about fifteen days old. Brain and heart represented from right side. Digestive tube and yolk sac in median section.
