= Ligament =

Connective tissue between bones

Details
- System: Musculoskeletal system
- Function: Connect bones to other bones; maintain position of organs

Identifiers
- Latin: ligamentum (Plural: ligamenta)
- MeSH: D008022
- TA98: A03.0.00.034
- FMA: 70773 30319, 70773

A ligament is a type of fibrous connective tissue in the body that connects bones to other bones. It also connects flight feathers to bones, in dinosaurs and birds. All 30,000 species of amniotes (land animals with internal bones) have ligaments.

It is also known as articular ligament, articular larua, fibrous ligament, or true ligament.

== Comparative anatomy ==
Ligaments are similar to tendons and fasciae as they are all made of connective tissue. The differences among them are in the connections that they make: ligaments connect one bone to another bone, tendons connect muscle to bone, and fasciae connect muscles to other muscles. These are all found in the skeletal system of the human body. Ligaments cannot usually be regenerated naturally; however, there are periodontal ligament stem cells located near the periodontal ligament which are involved in the adult regeneration of periodontist ligament.

The study of ligaments is known as desmology.

== Humans ==
Other ligaments in the body include the:

- Peritoneal ligament: a fold of peritoneum or other membranes.
- Fetal remnant ligament: the remnants of a fetal tubular structure.
- Periodontal ligament: a group of fibers that attach the cementum of teeth to the surrounding alveolar bone.

== Articular ligaments ==
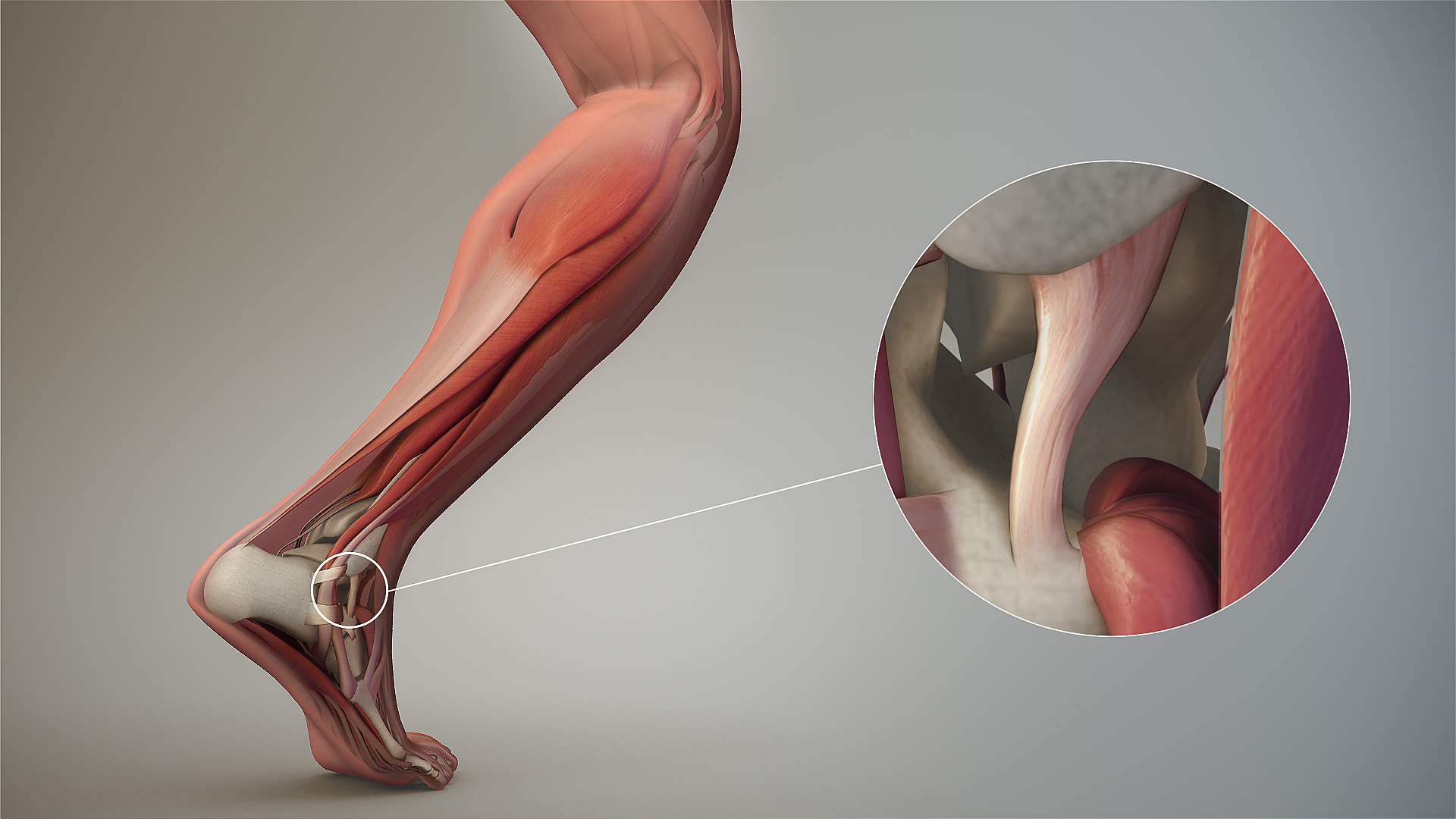
Articular ligament

"Ligament" most commonly refers to a band of dense regular connective tissue bundles made of collagenous fibers, with bundles protected by dense irregular connective tissue sheaths. Ligaments connect bones to other bones to form joints, while tendons connect bone to muscle. Some ligaments limit the mobility of articulations or prevent certain movements altogether.

Capsular ligaments are part of the articular capsule that surrounds synovial joints. They act as mechanical reinforcements. Extra-capsular ligaments join in harmony with the other ligaments and provide joint stability. Intra-capsular ligaments, which are much less common, also provide stability but permit a far larger range of motion. Cruciate ligaments are paired ligaments in the form of a cross.

Ligaments are viscoelastic. They gradually strain when under tension and return to their original shape when the tension is removed. However, they cannot retain their original shape when extended past a certain point or for a prolonged period of time. This is one reason why dislocated joints must be set as quickly as possible: if the ligaments lengthen too much, then the joint will be weakened, becoming prone to future dislocations. Athletes, gymnasts, dancers, and martial artists perform stretching exercises to lengthen their ligaments, making their joints more supple.

The term hypermobility refers to the characteristic of people with more-elastic ligaments, allowing their joints to stretch and contort further; this is sometimes still called double-jointedness.

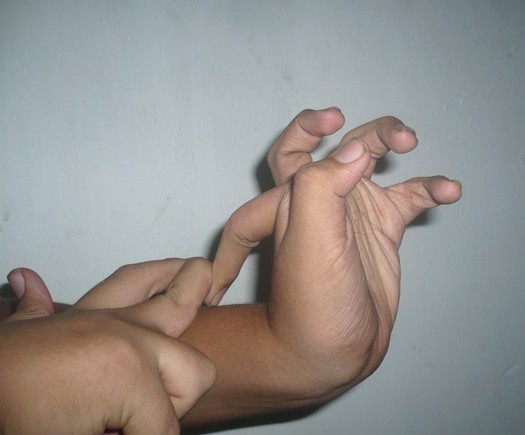
Hypermobile finger

The consequence of a broken ligament can be instability of the joint. Not all broken ligaments need surgery, but, if surgery is needed to stabilise the joint, the broken ligament can be repaired. Scar tissue may prevent this. If it is not possible to fix the broken ligament, other procedures such as the Brunelli procedure can correct the instability. Instability of a joint can over time lead to wear of the cartilage and eventually to osteoarthritis.

=== Artificial ligaments ===
One of the most often torn ligaments in the body is the anterior cruciate ligament (ACL). The ACL is one of the ligaments crucial to knee stability and persons who tear their ACL often undergo reconstructive surgery, which can be done through a variety of techniques and materials. One of these techniques is the replacement of the ligament with an artificial material. Artificial ligaments are a synthetic material composed of a polymer, such as polyacrylonitrile fiber, polypropylene, PET (polyethylene terephthalate), or polyNaSS poly (sodium styrene sulfonate).

=== Examples ===
There are about 900 ligaments in an average adult human body, of which about 25 are listed here.

Head and neck

- Cricothyroid ligament
- Periodontal ligament
- Suspensory ligament of the lens

Thorax

- Phrenoesophageal ligament
- Suspensory ligament of the breast

Pelvis

- Anterior sacroiliac ligament
- Posterior sacroiliac ligament
- Sacrotuberous ligament
- Sacrospinous ligament
- Inferior pubic ligament
- Reflex inguinal ligament
- Superior pubic ligament
- Suspensory ligament of the clitoris
- Suspensory ligament of the penis

Wrist

- Palmar radiocarpal ligament
- Dorsal radiocarpal ligament
- Ulnar collateral ligament
- Radial collateral ligament
- Scapholunate ligament

Knee

- Anterior cruciate ligament
- Lateral collateral ligament
- Posterior cruciate ligament
- Medial collateral ligament
- Cranial cruciate ligament — quadruped equivalent of anterior cruciate ligament
- Caudal cruciate ligament — quadruped equivalent of posterior cruciate ligament
- Oblique popliteal ligament
- Patellar ligament

== Peritoneal ligaments ==
Certain folds of peritoneum are referred to as ligaments. Examples include:

- The hepatoduodenal ligament, that surrounds the hepatic portal vein and other vessels as they travel from the duodenum to the liver.
- The broad ligament of the uterus, also a fold of peritoneum.

== Fetal remnant ligaments ==
Certain tubular structures from the fetal period are referred to as ligaments after they close up and turn into cord-like structures:

| Fetal | Adult |
|---|---|
| ductus arteriosus | ligamentum arteriosum |
| extra-hepatic portion of the fetal left umbilical vein | ligamentum teres hepatis (the "round ligament of the liver"). |
| intra-hepatic portion of the fetal left umbilical vein (the ductus venosus) | ligamentum venosum |
| distal portions of the fetal left and right umbilical arteries | medial umbilical ligaments |

== See also ==
- Ligamentous laxity
- Broström procedure
