= Fetus =

Prenatal organism between the embryonic state and birth

A fetus or foetus (/ˈfiːtəs/; pl.: fetuses or foetuses) is the unborn offspring of a viviparous animal that develops from an embryo. Following the embryonic stage, the fetal stage of development takes place. Prenatal development is a continuum, with no clear defining feature distinguishing an embryo from a fetus. However, in general a fetus is characterized by the presence of all the major body organs, though they will not yet be fully developed and functional, and some may not yet be situated in their final anatomical location.

In human prenatal development, fetal development begins from the ninth week after fertilization (which is the eleventh week of gestational age) and continues until the birth of a newborn.

== Etymology ==
The word fetus (plural fetuses or rarely, the solecism feti) comes from Latin fētus 'offspring, bringing forth, hatching of young'. The Latin plural fetūs is not used in English; occasionally the plural feti is used in English by analogy with second-declension Latin nouns.

The predominant British, Irish, and Commonwealth spelling is foetus, except in medical usage, where fetus is preferred. The -oe- spelling is first attested in 1594 and arose in Late Latin by analogy with classical Latin words like amoenus.

== Non-human animals ==
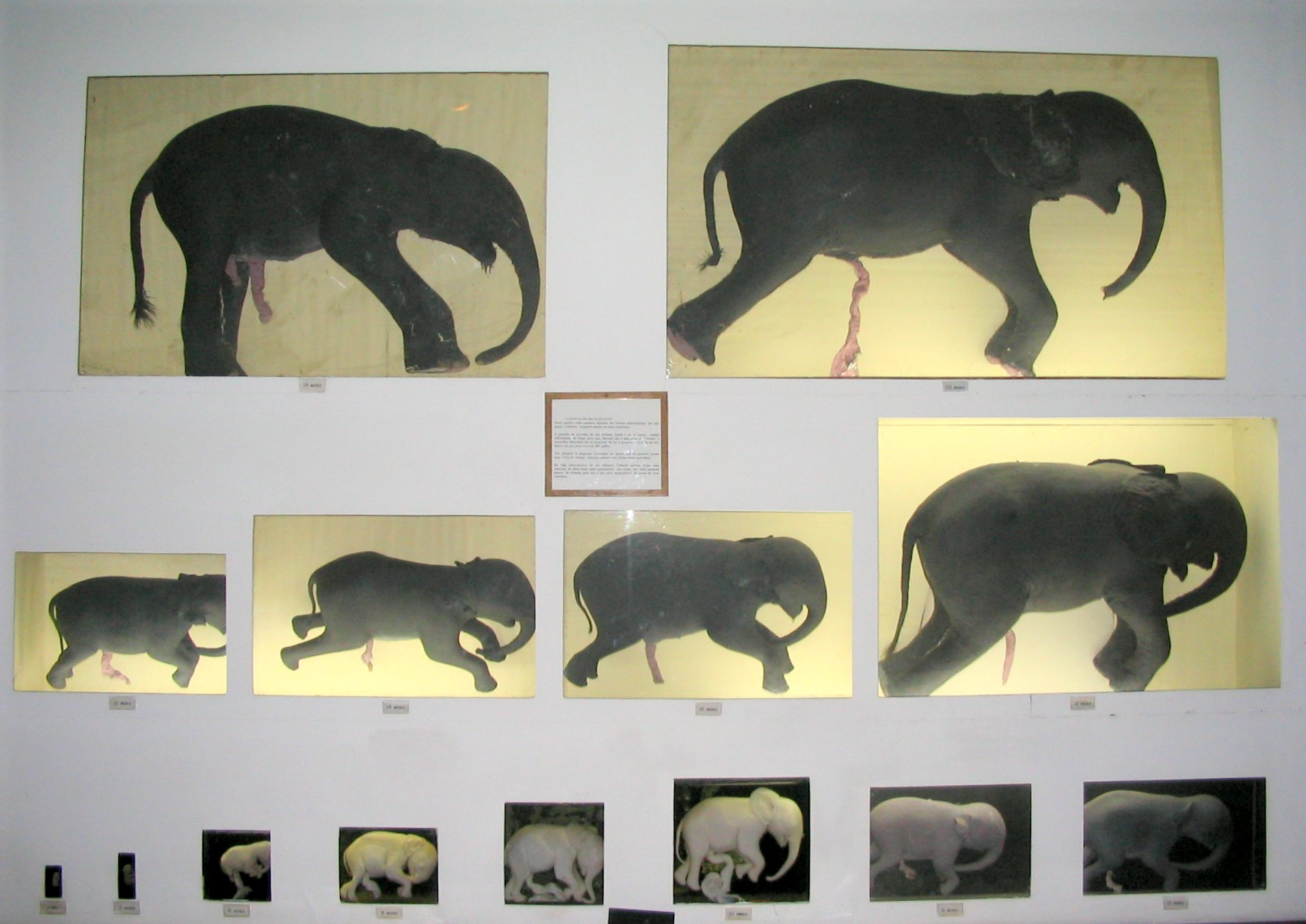
Fourteen phases of elephant development before birth

A fetus is a stage in the prenatal development of viviparous organisms. This stage lies between embryogenesis and birth. Many vertebrates have fetal stages, ranging from most mammals to many fish. In addition, some invertebrates bear live young, including some species of onychophora and many arthropods.

The fetuses of most mammals are situated similarly to the human fetus within their mothers. However, the anatomy of the area surrounding a fetus is different in litter-bearing animals compared to humans: each fetus of a litter-bearing animal is surrounded by placental tissue and is lodged along one of two long uteri instead of the single uterus found in a human female.

Development at birth varies considerably among animals, and even among mammals. Altricial species are relatively helpless at birth and require considerable parental care and protection. In contrast, precocial animals are born with open eyes, have hair or down, have large brains, and are immediately mobile and somewhat able to flee from, or defend themselves against, predators. Primates are precocial at birth, with the exception of humans.

The duration of gestation in placental mammals varies from 18 days in jumping mice to 23 months in elephants. Generally speaking, fetuses of larger land mammals require longer gestation periods.

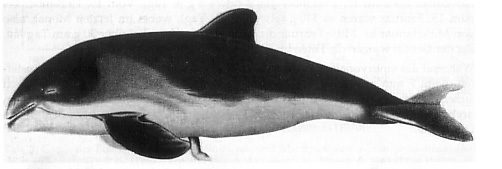
Fetal stage of a porpoise

The benefits of a fetal stage means that young are more developed when they are born. Therefore, they may need less parental care and may be better able to fend for themselves. However, carrying fetuses exerts costs on the mother, who must take on extra food to fuel the growth of her offspring, and whose mobility and comfort may be affected (especially toward the end of the fetal stage).

In some instances, the presence of a fetal stage may allow organisms to time the birth of their offspring to a favorable season.

== Development in humans ==
=== Weeks 9 to 16 (2 to 3.6 months) ===
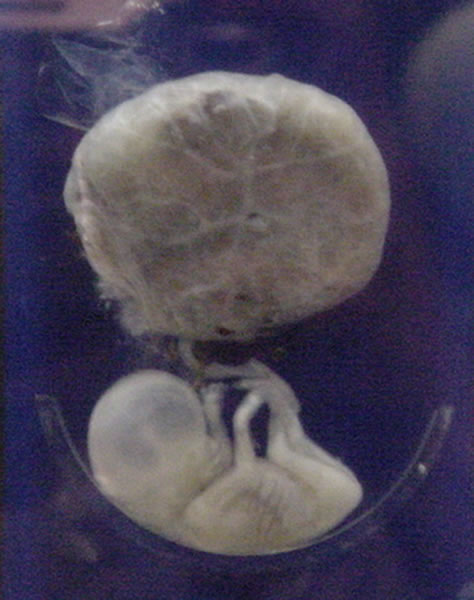
A human fetus, attached to placenta, at three months gestational age

In humans, the fetal stage starts nine weeks after fertilization. At this time the fetus is typically about 30 millimetres (1 1/4 in) in length from crown to rump, and weighs about 8 grams. The head makes up nearly half of the size of the fetus. Breathing-like movements of the fetus are necessary for the stimulation of lung development, rather than for obtaining oxygen. The heart, hands, feet, brain, and other organs are present, but are only at the beginning of development and have minimal operation. Uncontrolled movements and twitches occur as muscles, the brain, and pathways begin to develop.

=== Weeks 17 to 25 (3.6 to 6.6 months) ===
A woman pregnant for the first time (nulliparous) typically feels fetal movements at about 21 weeks, whereas a woman who has given birth before will typically feel movements by 20 weeks. By the end of the fifth month, the fetus is about 20 cm (8 in) long.

=== Weeks 26 to 38 (6.6 to 8.6 months) ===
The amount of body fat rapidly increases. Lungs are not fully mature. Neural connections between the sensory cortex and thalamus develop as early as 24 weeks of gestational age, but the first evidence of their function does not occur until around 30 weeks. Bones are fully developed but are still soft and pliable. Iron, calcium, and phosphorus become more abundant. Fingernails reach the end of the fingertips. The lanugo, or fine hair, begins to disappear until it is gone except on the upper arms and shoulders. Small breast buds are present in both sexes. Head hair becomes coarse and thicker. The survival rate rises to over 90% for babies born at 25–27 weeks weeks of gestation (6 1/2 – 6 3/4 months). The fetus is considered full-term between weeks 37 and 40. Birth is imminent and occurs around the 38th week after fertilization, followed by life outside the uterus. It may be 48 to 53 cm (19 to 21 in) in length when born. Control of movement is limited at birth, and purposeful voluntary movements continue to develop until puberty.

=== Variation in growth ===
There is much variation in the growth of the human fetus. When the fetal size is less than expected, the condition is known as intrauterine growth restriction also called fetal growth restriction; factors affecting fetal growth can be maternal, placental, or fetal.

- Maternal factors include maternal weight, body mass index, nutritional state, emotional stress, toxin exposure (including tobacco, alcohol, heroin, and other drugs which can also harm the fetus in other ways), and uterine blood flow.
- Placental factors include size, microstructure (densities and architecture), umbilical blood flow, transporters and binding proteins, nutrient utilization, and nutrient production.
- Fetal factors include the fetal genome, nutrient production, and hormone output. Also, female fetuses tend to weigh less than males, at full term.

Fetal growth is often classified as follows: small for gestational age (SGA), appropriate for gestational age (AGA), and large for gestational age (LGA). SGA can result in low birth weight, although premature birth can also result in low birth weight. Low birth weight increases the risk for perinatal mortality (death shortly after birth), asphyxia, hypothermia, polycythemia, hypocalcemia, immune dysfunction, neurologic abnormalities, and other long-term health problems. SGA may be associated with growth delay, or it may instead be associated with absolute stunting of growth.

=== Fruit size comparison ===
During pregnancy, comparison of the size of the developing fetus to a fruit is a common practice. The fruits used as a reference vary by source. One source, the Australian Department of Health describes an 8-week embryo as the size of a raspberry, and a 21-week old fetus as the size of a rockmelon. The Scottish National Health Service describes an embryo at 5 weeks of gestation as the size of an "apple pip" and a raisin at week 8. Nurses report these comparisons are accurate after measuring expected sizes with actual fruits.

== Viability ==
Stages in prenatal development, showing viability and point of 50% chance of survival at bottom. Weeks and months numbered by gestation.

Fetal viability refers to a point in fetal development at which the fetus may survive outside the womb. The lower limit of viability is approximately 5 3/4 months gestational age and is usually later.

There is no sharp limit of development, age, or weight at which a fetus automatically becomes viable. According to data from 2003 to 2005, survival rates are 20–35% for babies born at 23 weeks of gestation (5 3/4 months); 50–70% at 24–25 weeks (6 – 6 1/4 months); and >90% at 26–27 weeks (6 1/2 – 6 3/4 months) and over. It is rare for a baby weighing less than 500 g (1 lb 2 oz) to survive.

When such premature babies are born, the main causes of mortality are that neither the respiratory system nor the central nervous system are completely differentiated. If given expert postnatal care, some preterm babies weighing less than 500 g (1 lb 2 oz) may survive, and are referred to as extremely low birth weight or immature infants.

Preterm birth is the most common cause of infant mortality, causing almost 30 percent of neonatal deaths. At an occurrence rate of 5% to 18% of all deliveries, it is also more common than postmature birth, which occurs in 3% to 12% of pregnancies.

== Circulatory system ==
=== Before birth ===
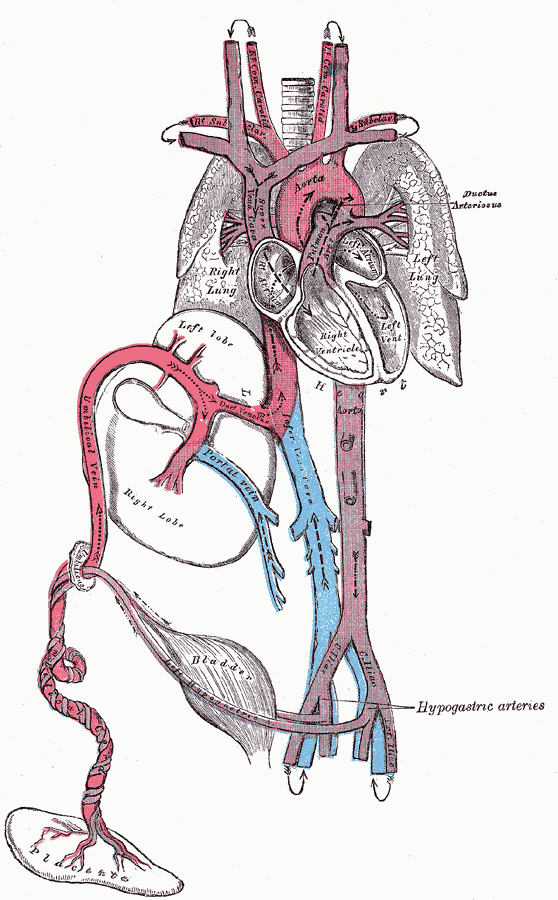
Diagram of the human fetal circulatory system

The heart and blood vessels of the circulatory system form relatively early during embryonic development, but continue to grow and develop in complexity in the growing fetus. A functional circulatory system is a biological necessity since mammalian tissues can not grow more than a few cell layers thick without an active blood supply. The prenatal circulation of blood is different from postnatal circulation, mainly because the lungs are not in use. The fetus obtains oxygen and nutrients from the mother through the placenta and the umbilical cord.

Blood from the placenta is carried to the fetus by the umbilical vein. About half of this enters the fetal ductus venosus and is carried to the inferior vena cava, while the other half enters the liver proper from the inferior border of the liver. The branch of the umbilical vein that supplies the right lobe of the liver first joins with the portal vein. The blood then moves to the right atrium of the heart. In the fetus, there is an opening between the right and left atrium (the foramen ovale), and most of the blood flows from the right into the left atrium, thus bypassing pulmonary circulation. The majority of blood flow is into the left ventricle from where it is pumped through the aorta into the body. Some of the blood moves from the aorta through the internal iliac arteries to the umbilical arteries and re-enters the placenta, where carbon dioxide and other waste products from the fetus are taken up and enter the mother's circulation.

Some of the blood from the right atrium does not enter the left atrium, but enters the right ventricle and is pumped into the pulmonary artery. In the fetus, there is a special connection between the pulmonary artery and the aorta, called the ductus arteriosus, which directs most of this blood away from the lungs (which are not being used for respiration at this point as the fetus is suspended in amniotic fluid).

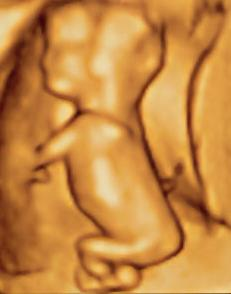
3D ultrasound of 80-millimetre (3 in) fetus (about 3 1/2 months gestational age)

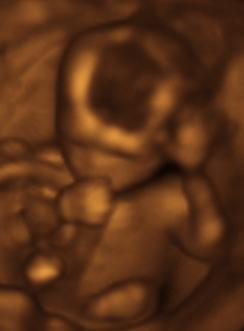
Fetus at 4 1/4 months

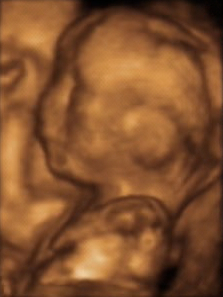
Fetus at 5 months

=== Postnatal development ===
With the first breath after birth, the system changes suddenly. Pulmonary resistance is reduced dramatically, prompting more blood to move into the pulmonary arteries from the right atrium and ventricle of the heart and less to flow through the foramen ovale into the left atrium. The blood from the lungs travels through the pulmonary veins to the left atrium, producing an increase in pressure that pushes the septum primum against the septum secundum, closing the foramen ovale and completing the separation of the newborn's circulatory system into the standard left and right sides. Thereafter, the foramen ovale is known as the fossa ovalis.

The ductus arteriosus normally closes within one or two days of birth, leaving the ligamentum arteriosum, while the umbilical vein and ductus venosus usually closes within two to five days after birth, leaving, respectively, the liver's ligamentum teres and ligamentum venosus.

== Immune system ==
The placenta functions as a maternal-fetal barrier against the transmission of microbes. When this is insufficient, mother-to-child transmission of infectious diseases can occur.

Maternal IgG antibodies cross the placenta, giving the fetus passive immunity against those diseases for which the mother has antibodies. This transfer of antibodies in humans begins as early as the fifth month (gestational age) and certainly by the sixth month.

== Developmental problems ==
A developing fetus is highly susceptible to anomalies in its growth and metabolism, increasing the risk of birth defects. One area of concern is the lifestyle choices made during pregnancy. Diet is especially important in the early stages of development. Studies show that supplementation of the person's diet with folic acid reduces the risk of spina bifida and other neural tube defects. Another dietary concern is whether breakfast is eaten. Skipping breakfast could lead to extended periods of lower than normal nutrients in the maternal blood, leading to a higher risk of prematurity, or birth defects.

Alcohol consumption may increase the risk of the development of fetal alcohol syndrome, a condition leading to intellectual disability in some infants. Smoking during pregnancy may also lead to miscarriages and low birth weight (2,500 grams (5 pounds 8 ounces). Low birth weight is a concern for medical providers due to the tendency of these infants, described as "premature by weight", to have a higher risk of secondary medical problems.

X-rays are known to have possible adverse effects on the development of the fetus, and the risks need to be weighed against the benefits.

Congenital disorders are acquired before birth. Infants with certain congenital heart defects can survive only as long as the ductus remains open: in such cases the closure of the ductus can be delayed by the administration of prostaglandins to permit sufficient time for the surgical correction of the anomalies. Conversely, in cases of patent ductus arteriosus, where the ductus does not properly close, drugs that inhibit prostaglandin synthesis can be used to encourage its closure, so that surgery can be avoided.

Other heart birth defects include ventricular septal defect, pulmonary atresia, and tetralogy of Fallot.

An abdominal pregnancy can result in the death of the fetus and where this is rarely not resolved it can lead to its formation into a lithopedion.

== Fetal pain ==
The existence and implications of fetal pain are debated politically and academically. According to the conclusions of a review published in 2005, "Evidence regarding the capacity for fetal pain is limited but indicates that fetal perception of pain is unlikely before the third trimester." However, developmental neurobiologists argue that the establishment of thalamocortical connections (at about 6 1/2 months) is an essential event with regard to fetal perception of pain. Nevertheless, the perception of pain involves sensory, emotional and cognitive factors and it is "impossible to know" when pain is experienced, even if it is known when thalamocortical connections are established. Some authors argue that fetal pain is possible from the second half of pregnancy. Evidence suggests that the perception of pain in the fetus occurs well before late gestation.

Whether a fetus has the ability to feel pain and suffering is part of the abortion debate. In the United States, for example, anti-abortion advocates have proposed legislation that would require providers of abortions to tell pregnant women that their fetuses will feel pain during the procedure and that would require each person to accept or decline anesthesia for the fetus.

== Legal and social issues ==
Abortion of a human pregnancy is legal and/or tolerated in most countries, although with gestational time limits that normally prohibit late-term abortions.

== See also ==
- Fetal position
- Fetal rights
- Fetoscopy
- Neural development
- Potential person
- Pregnancy (mammals)
- Superfetation
- Women's rights

Preceded by Embryo	Stages of human development Fetus	Succeeded by Infancy
