= Falciform ligament =

Ligament attaching the liver to the front body wall

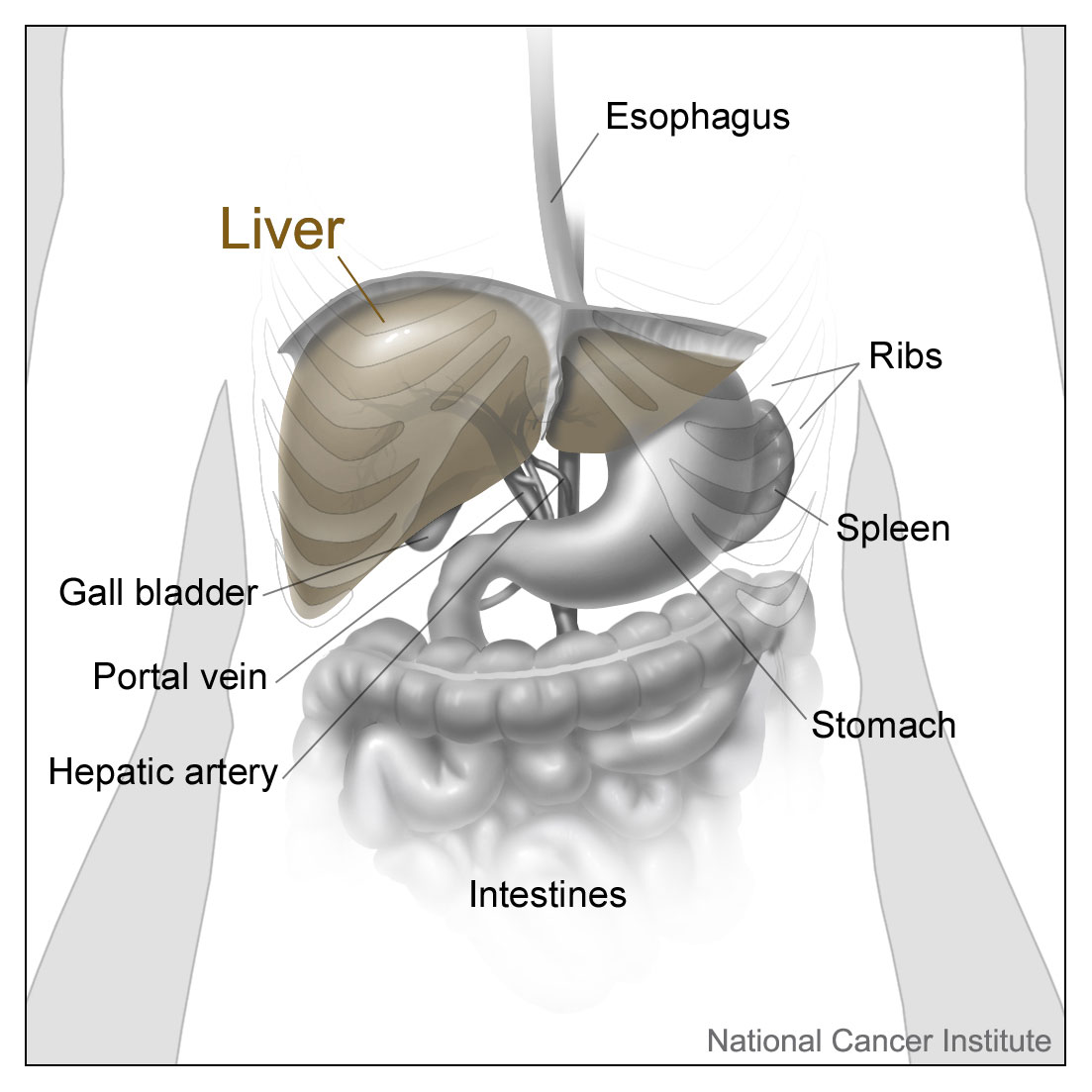
- The falciform ligament is seen here, dividing the liver from the front into a left and a right lobe.

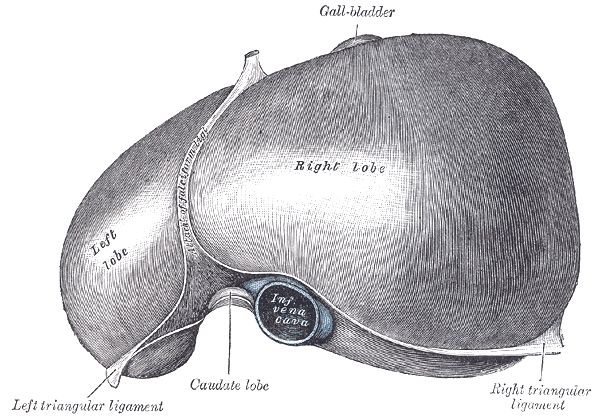
- The liver viewed from above. Falciform ligament can be seen separating the left medial from the right lateral lobes of liver.

Details

Identifiers
- Latin: ligamentum falciforme hepatis
- TA98: A10.1.02.303
- TA2: 3771
- FMA: 15823

In human anatomy, the falciform ligament (from Latin 'sickle-shaped') is a ligament that attaches the liver to the front body wall and divides the liver into the left lobe and right lobe. The falciform ligament is a broad and thin fold of peritoneum, its base being directed downward and backward and its apex upward and forward. It droops down from the hilum of the liver.

== Structure ==
The falciform ligament stretches obliquely from the front to the back of the abdomen, with one surface in contact with the peritoneum behind the right rectus abdominis muscle and the diaphragm, and the other in contact with the left lobe of the liver.

The ligament stretches from the underside of the diaphragm to the posterior surface of the sheath of the right rectus abdominis muscle, as low down as the umbilicus; by its right margin it extends from the notch on the anterior margin of the liver, as far back as the posterior surface.

It is composed of two layers of peritoneum closely united together.

Its base or free edge contains, between its layers, the round ligament and the paraumbilical veins.

=== Development ===
It is a remnant of the embryonic ventral mesentery. The umbilical vein of the fetus gives rise to the round ligament of liver in the adult, which is found in the free border of the falciform ligament.

== Clinical significance ==
The falciform ligament can become canalized if an individual is suffering from portal hypertension. Due to the increase in venous congestion, blood is pushed down from the liver towards the anterior abdominal wall and if blood pools here, will result in dilatation of veins around the umbilicus. If these veins radiate out from the umbilicus, they can give the appearance of a head (the umbilicus) with hair of snakes (the veins) – this is referred to as caput medusae.

== Additional images ==
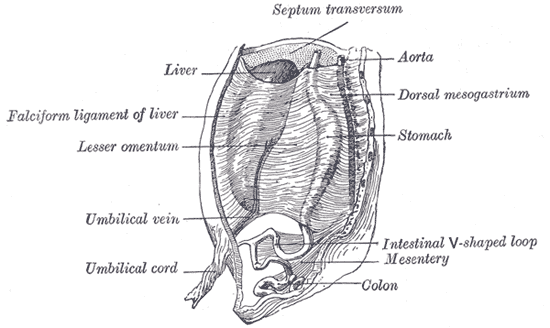
Cross-section showing the primitive mesentery of a six weeks' human embryo

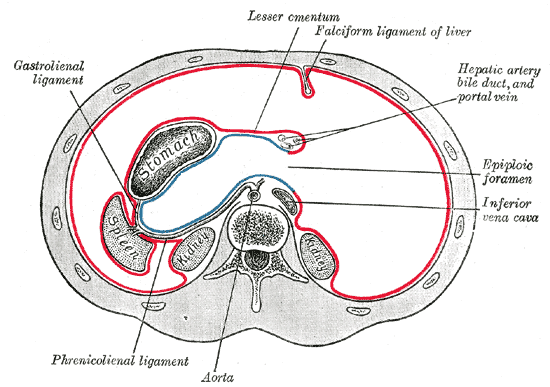
Cross-section showing folds of peritoneum in the upper abdomen

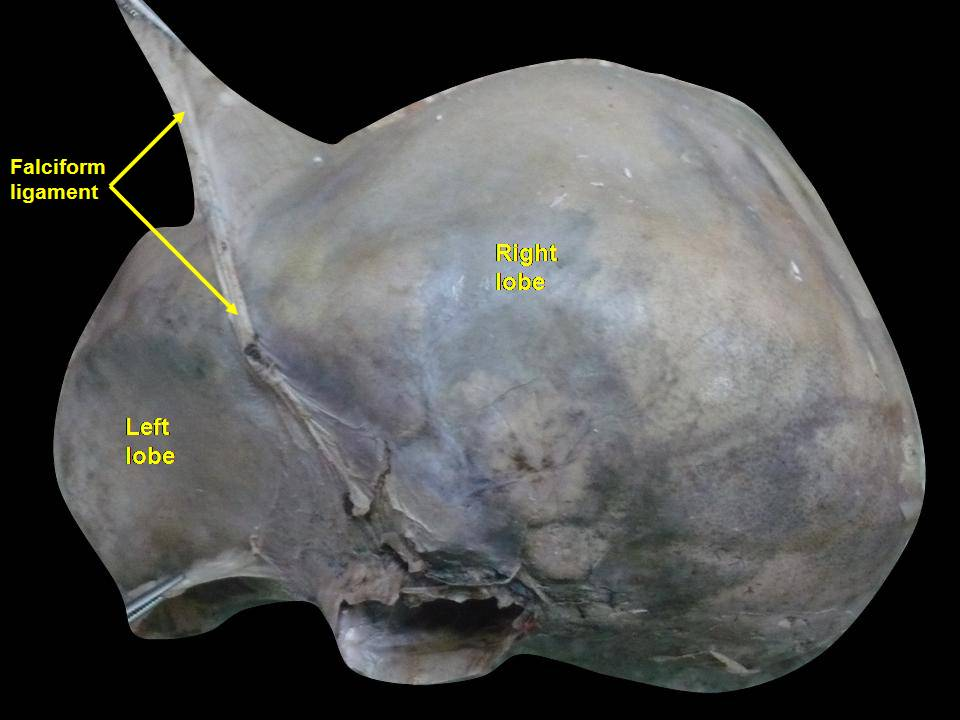
A cadaver liver seen from above, showing the falciform ligament at the top
