= D. P. Walker =

English historian

Daniel Pickering Walker (1914–1985) was an English historian and author of several noted studies on the occult in Western history.

== Life ==
Walker was trained at Oxford. He spent much of his career at the Warburg Institute at the University of London. He was made senior research fellow in 1953, and held the Warburg's Chair in the History of the Classical Tradition from 1975 until his retirement in 1981. Among his personal friends was the Dutch writer Gerard Reve.

== Works ==
Walker published works on musical humanism until the 1940s. His musicological works were later collected and published as Music, Spirit and Language in the Renaissance (1985). His first study of magic, Orpheus the Theologian and Renaissance Platonists, appeared in 1953.

His best-known work is Spiritual and Demonic Magic: From Ficino to Campanella (1958), which has been described as "a classic in Renaissance studies". The book examines the magic of Marsilio Ficino, explains a "General theory of natural magic", and analyzes thinkers who were supporters of magic, Johannes Trithemius, Heinrich Cornelius Agrippa, Paracelsus, Jacques Gohory, Pietro Pompanazzi, Francesco Giorgi, Pontus de Tyard, Guy Lefèvres de la Boderie, Fabio Paolini, Bernardino Telesio, Donio, Antonio Persio, Francis Bacon, and Tommaso Campanella, and those who opposed it, G. F. Pico, Johann Wier, Thomas Erastus, Symphorian Champier, Jacques Lefevre d'Etaples, Jean Bodin, and Martin del Rio.

Other works include The Decline of Hell: Seventeenth-Century Discussions of Eternal Torment (1964), The Ancient Theology: Studies in Christian Platonism from the Fifteenth to the Eighteenth Century (1972), and Unclean Spirits: Possession and Exorcism in France and England in the Late Sixteenth and Early Seventeenth Centuries (1981).
