= Fetal circulation =

Circulatory system of fetuses

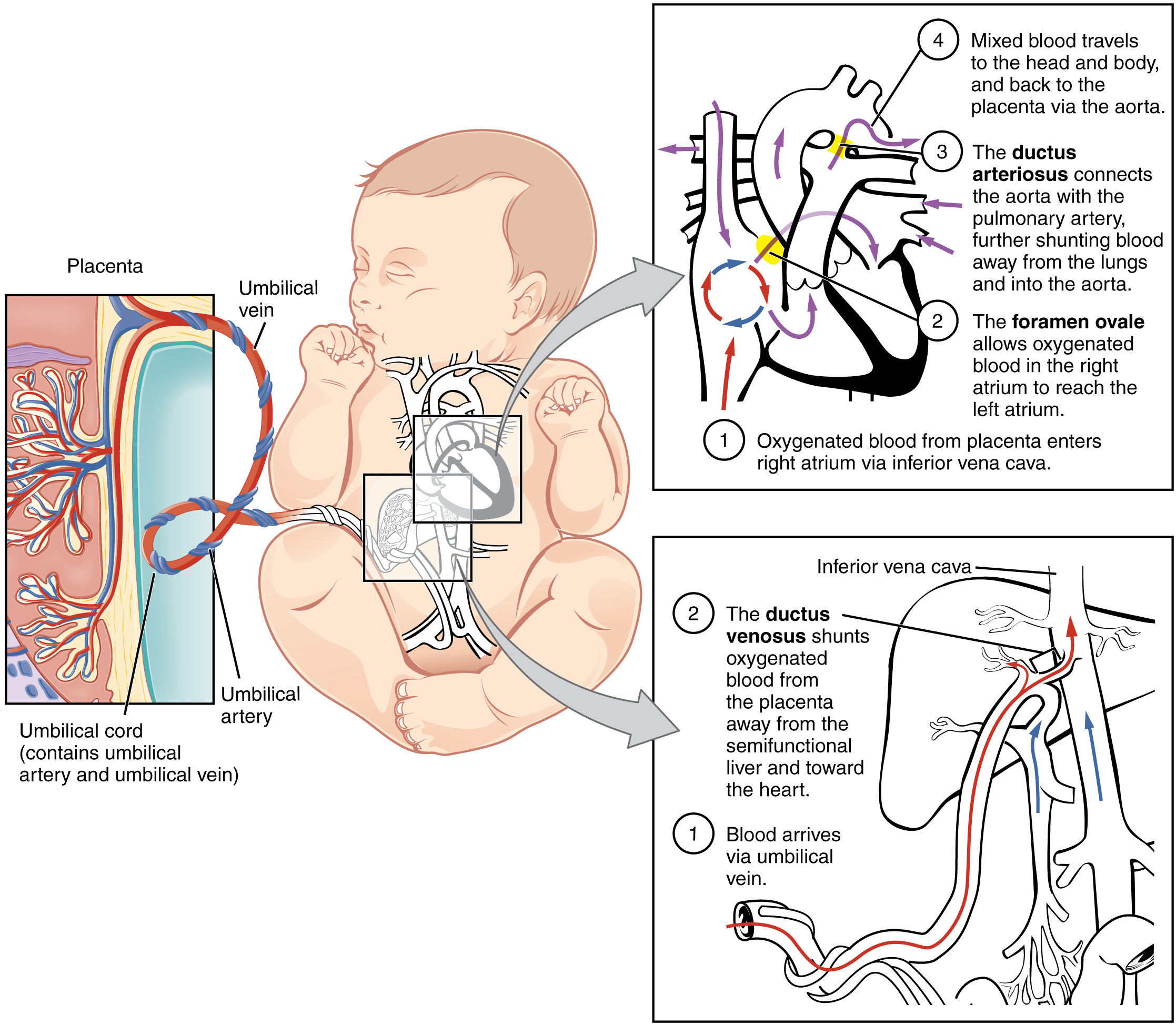
- The fetal circulatory system includes three shunts to divert blood from undeveloped and partially functioning organs, as well as blood supply to and from the placenta.

Details
- Gives rise to: Circulatory system

In humans, the circulatory system is different before and after birth. The fetal circulation is composed of the placenta, umbilical blood vessels encapsulated by the umbilical cord, heart and systemic blood vessels. A major difference between the fetal circulation and postnatal circulation is that the lungs are not used during the fetal stage resulting in the presence of shunts to move oxygenated blood and nutrients from the placenta to the fetal tissue. At birth, the start of breathing and the severance of the umbilical cord prompt various changes that quickly transform fetal circulation into postnatal circulation.

== Oxygenation, nutrient, and waste exchange ==
=== Placenta ===
The placenta functions as the exchange site of nutrients and wastes between the maternal and fetal circulation. Water, glucose, amino acids, vitamins, and inorganic salts freely diffuse across the placenta along with oxygen. Two umbilical arteries carry systemic arterial blood from the fetus to the placenta where waste is exchanged for oxygen and nutrients. The oxygenated blood will then return to the fetus from the placenta via the umbilical vein.

=== Oxygen transport in fetus ===
Hemoglobin is a structure found within the red blood cells that binds to and carries oxygen. Fetal hemoglobin enhances the fetus' ability to draw oxygen from the placenta. This is facilitated by the hemoglobin molecule that made up of two alpha and two gamma chains (2α2γ). Its oxygen-hemoglobin dissociation curve is shifted to the left, meaning that it is able to absorb oxygen at lower concentrations than adult hemoglobin. This enables fetal hemoglobin to absorb oxygen from adult hemoglobin in the placenta, where the oxygen pressure is lower than at the lungs. Around 6 months of age after birth, the gamma chains will gradually be replaced by beta chains. This new hemoglobin structure is known as hemoglobin A, composed of two alpha and two beta chains (2α2β). Hemoglobin A is the predominant form found in adults.

== Before birth ==
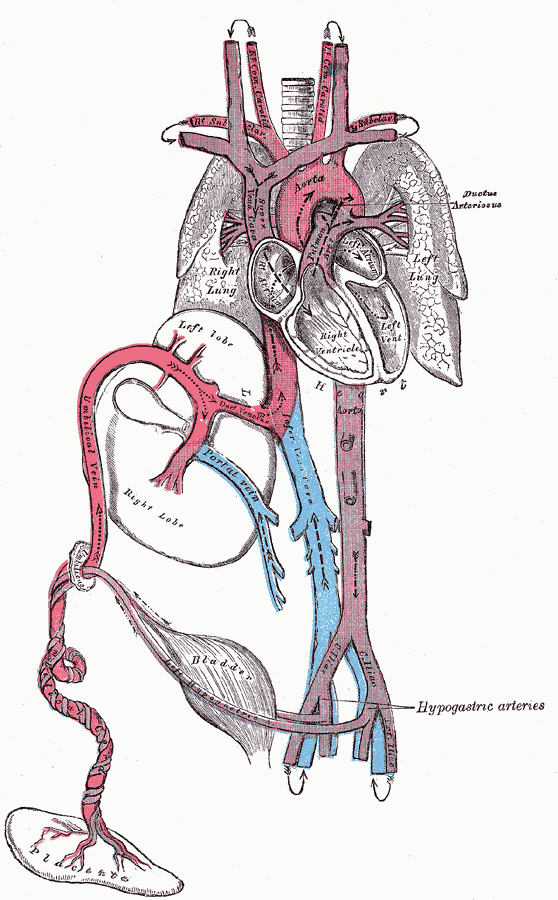
Diagram of the human fetal circulatory system.

Oxygenated blood from the placenta is carried to the fetus by the umbilical vein, which will drain into the inferior vena cava (IVC) through the ductus venosus or the liver. When oxygenated blood enters the IVC, it moves in parallel with deoxygenated blood from the fetal systemic veins, establishing a bilaminar blood flow as it enters the right atrium.

The fetal heart contains two upper atria and two lower ventricles. It also contains two additional structures, the foramen ovale and the ductus arteriosus, that function as shunts for oxygenated blood. The function of these shunts is to bypass the lungs and maintain proper circulation to important fetal tissue. In the fetal stage, the lungs fill with fluid and collapse because the fetus is within the amniotic sac and the placenta is providing the oxygen it needs to grow. With the lung collapsed, pulmonary vascular resistance remains high during the fetal stage to prevent blood flow into the lungs. As oxygenated blood arrives at the right atrium, the eustachian valve helps direct the oxygenated blood into the foramen ovale, an opening between the right and left atrium. As the blood flows through the left atrium, it will move through the mitral valve into the left ventricle and will be pumped through the aorta into the body. The shunting of oxygenated blood from right to left atrium will supply blood high in oxygen and nutrient content to the upper extremities, including the critically important brain. Some of the blood moves from the aorta through the internal iliac arteries to the umbilical arteries, and re-enters the placenta, where carbon dioxide and other waste products from the fetus are taken up and enter the maternal circulation.

Some of the blood entering the right atrium does not pass directly to the left atrium through the foramen ovale, but enters the right ventricle. This blood consists of oxygenated placental blood and deoxygenated blood returning from the fetal circulation. This blood is pumped into the pulmonary artery. At the pulmonary artery, it is met with high pulmonary vascular resistance as a result of collapsed lungs and pulmonary capillaries. In the fetus, there is a special connection between the pulmonary artery and the aorta, called the ductus arteriosus. Because the aorta has lower pressure than the pulmonary artery, most of the blood flows across the ductus arteriosus away from the lungs. Once the blood goes through the ductus arteriosus, it mixes with the blood from the aorta. This results in mixed blood oxygen saturation that supplies most of the structures of the lower half of the fetal body.

== After birth ==
As the umbilical vessels are obliterated and the infant starts breathing at birth, the source of oxygen changes from the placenta to the lungs. This major trigger will facilitate the transformation from fetal to postnatal circulation in many ways.

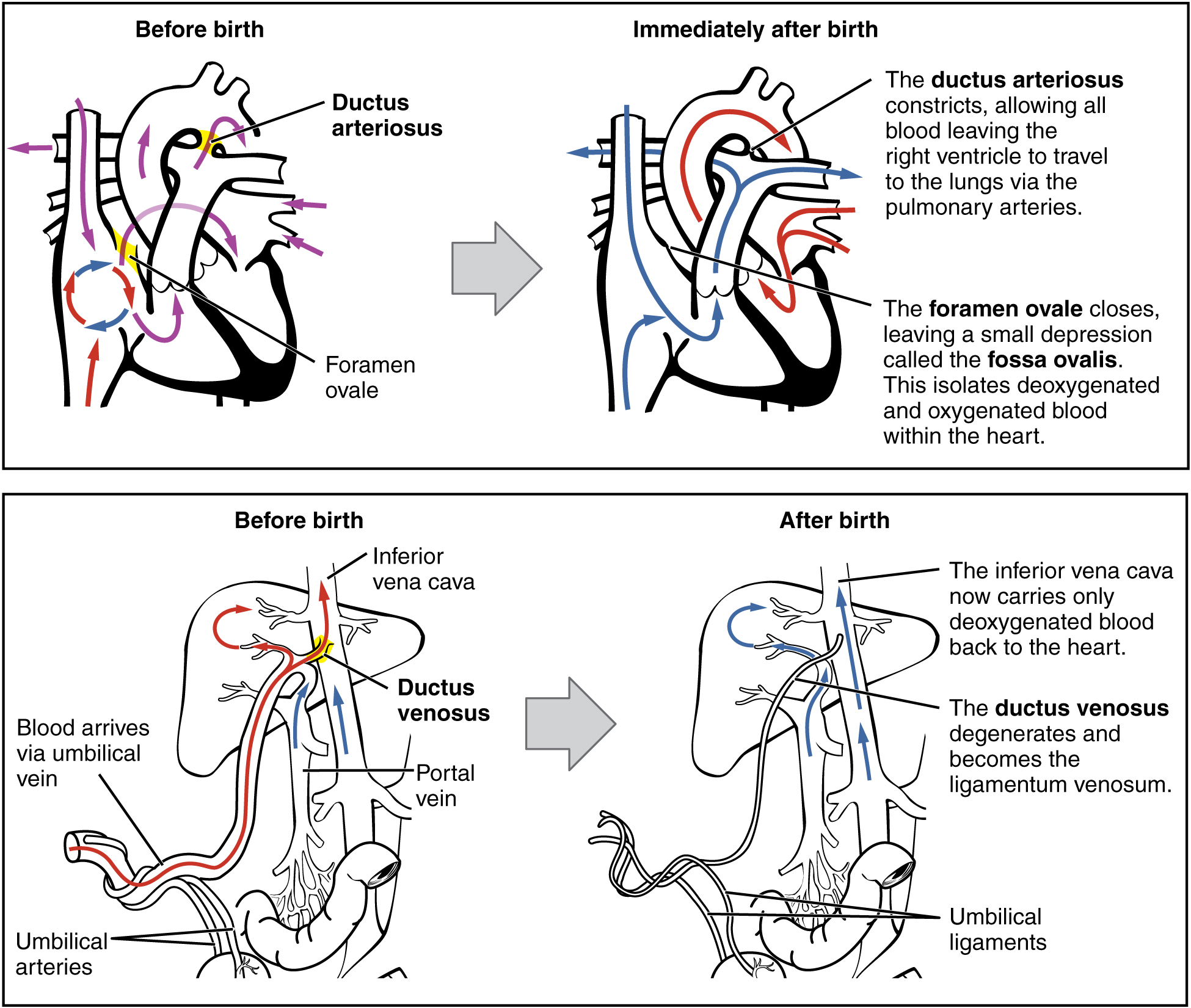
After birth, three fetal shunts close permanently, allowing blood flow to the liver and lungs.

First, the ductus venosus was previously kept open by the blood flow from the umbilical vein. The reduced blood flow through the umbilical vein at birth will collapse and close the ductus venosus. Hence, the IVC will only carry deoxygenated blood from the infant's organs and lower extremities. Second, as the infant breathes, the lungs will expand and fill the alveoli with oxygen. The increased oxygen content will dilate the pulmonary capillaries and also trigger the release of nitric oxide, which further dilates the blood vessels within the lungs. Together, these forces will decrease the pulmonary vascular resistance.

With decreased resistance in the lungs, there will be increased blood flow to the lungs from the right ventricle of the heart through the pulmonary arteries, establishing the newborn's pulmonary circulation. With each of the newborn's breaths, blood perfuses the pulmonary capillary beds and undergoes oxygenation before exiting the lungs via the pulmonary veins and returning to the heart. Thus, as more blood flows through the pulmonary circulation, there will be a higher volume of blood returning to the left atrium from the lungs. The increased venous return will elevate the pressure of the left atrium until it exceeds the pressure of the right atrium. The difference in pressure between these two chambers of the heart will close the foramen ovale.

Lastly, due to the decreased pulmonary vascular resistance, the pressure of the pulmonary artery will fall until it is lower than the pressure of the aorta. Since blood flows from high to low pressure systems, the direction of blood flow across the ductus arteriosus reverses. As the oxygen-rich blood from the aorta flows across the ductus arteriosus to the pulmonary artery, the ductus arteriosus will constrict in response to the high oxygen content of the blood. While oxygen serves as a vasoconstrictor of the ductus arteriosus, prostaglandins can keep the ductus arteriosus open to maintain blood flow to the lower extremities in cases of hypoplastic left heart syndrome where the mitral valve is shut. The removal of the placenta, a source of prostaglandin, is another mechanism by which the ductus arteriosus closes at birth. Within the next 2 to 3 weeks, the constriction results in decreased blood flow to the structure which induces the death of the tissue to keep the structure permanently closed.

As a result of these changes, postnatal circulation will direct deoxygenated blood from the inferior and superior vena cava to the right heart, from which the blood will flow to the lungs via the pulmonary circulation. Blood will be oxygenated in the lungs and return to the left heart, which will pump oxygen-rich blood out through the aorta to supply the rest of the body via the systemic circulation.

In certain cases, the transition from fetal to postnatal circulation may not occur as described above due to complications leading to persistently high pulmonary vascular resistance. Preterm infants are born without fully mature lungs lacking the surfactant compound that allows alveoli to remain open by overcoming the surface tension of water. The resulting difficulty in lung expansion prevents the necessary reduction in pulmonary vascular resistance for the infant to make the normal cardiopulmonary transition, resulting in infant respiratory distress syndrome. In addition, occasionally during birth, infants may inhale remnants of their fecal matter known as meconium, preventing adequate breathing. The presence of meconium within the lungs, known as meconium aspiration syndrome, can obstruct the airways and also deactivate the newborn's surfactant. The inflammation that also results from the inhalation of meconium also causes airway constriction, resulting in poor ventilation of the alveoli and inadequate oxygenation of the pulmonary capillary beds. With a lack of oxygen entering the lungs, pulmonary vascular resistance will remain high and the newborn's blood will no longer be oxygenated, preventing fetal shunt closure.

In both cases of infant respiratory distress syndrome and meconium aspiration syndrome, fetal shunts will remain open due to the high pulmonary vascular resistance until appropriate measures, such as administration of surfactant or mechanical ventilation, are taken to help the infant breathe on its own. If the problem is not corrected, the infant will undergo hypoxia, acidosis, and other serious complications, such as seizures.

== Adult remnants ==
Remnants of the fetal circulation can be found in the adult.

Fetal	Develops
foramen ovale	fossa ovalis
ductus arteriosus	ligamentum arteriosum
extra-hepatic portion of the fetal left umbilical vein	ligamentum teres hepatis ("round ligament of the liver")
intra-hepatic portion of the fetal left umbilical vein (ductus venosus)	ligamentum venosum
proximal portions of the fetal left and right umbilical arteries	umbilical branches of the internal iliac arteries
distal portions of the fetal left and right umbilical arteries	umbilical ligaments

== Physiology ==
The core concept behind fetal circulation is that fetal hemoglobin (HbF) has a higher affinity for oxygen than does adult hemoglobin, which, together with the difference in partial pressure of oxygen, allows a diffusion of oxygen from the mother's circulatory system to the fetus.

=== Blood pressure ===
It is the fetal heart and not the mother's heart that builds up the fetal blood pressure to drive its blood through the fetal circulation.

Intracardiac pressure remains identical between the right and left ventricles of the human fetus.

The blood pressure in the fetal aorta is approximately 30 mmHg at 20 weeks of gestation, and increases to ca 45 mmHg at 40 weeks of gestation. The fetal pulse pressure is ca 20 mmHg at 20 weeks of gestation, increasing to ca 30 mmHg at 40 weeks of gestation.

The blood pressure decreases when passing through the placenta. In the arteria umbilicalis, it is ca 50 mmHg. It falls to 30 mmHg in the capillaries in the villi. Subsequently, the pressure is 20 mm Hg in the umbilical vein, returning to the heart.

=== Flow ===
The blood flow through the umbilical cord is approximately 35 mL/min at 20 weeks, and 240 mL/min at 40 weeks of gestation. Adapted to the weight of the fetus, this corresponds to 115 mL/min/kg at 20 weeks and 64 mL/min/kg at 40 weeks. It corresponds to 17% of the combined cardiac output of the fetus at 10 weeks, and 33% at 20 weeks of gestation.

Endothelin and prostanoids cause vasoconstriction in placental arteries, while nitric oxide causes vasodilation. On the other hand, there is no neural vascular regulation, and catecholamines have only little effect.

== Additional images ==
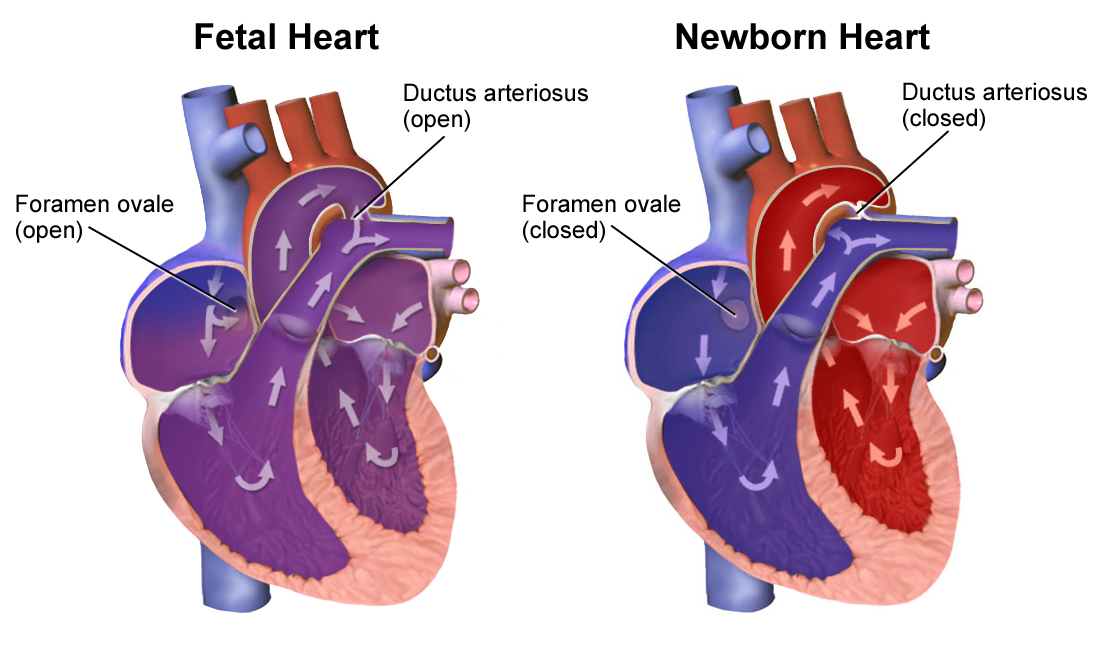
Neonatal heart circulation

Obstetric ultrasonography of an embryo of 8 weeks with visible heartbeat
