= Ductus arteriosus =

Fetal blood vessel bypassing the lungs

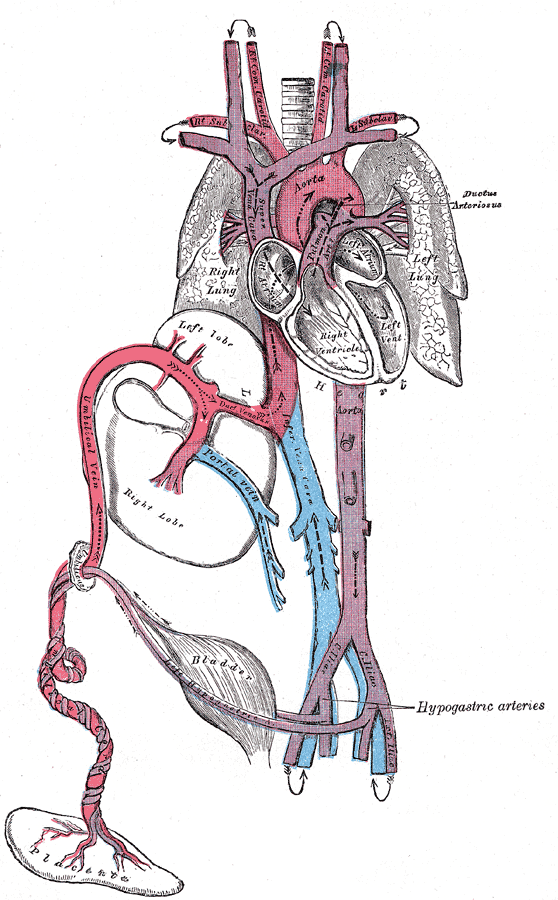
- The fetal circulatory system, with the ductus arteriosus visible at upper right.

Details
- Precursor: Aortic arch 6
- System: Fetal circulation
- Source: Pulmonary artery
- Branches: Descending aorta
- Vein: Ductus venosus

Identifiers
- Latin: ductus arteriosus
- MeSH: D004373
- TA2: 4093
- TE: arteriosus_by_E5.11.2.1.2.0.17 E5.11.2.1.2.0.17
- FMA: 79871

The ductus arteriosus, also called the ductus Botalli, named after the Italian physiologist Leonardo Botallo, is a blood vessel in the developing fetus connecting the trunk of the pulmonary artery to the proximal descending aorta. It allows most of the blood from the right ventricle to bypass the fetus's fluid-filled non-functioning lungs. Upon closure at birth, it becomes the ligamentum arteriosum.

== Development and structure ==
The ductus arteriosus is formed from the left 6th aortic arch during embryonic development and attaches to the final part of the aortic arch (the isthmus of aorta) and the first part of the pulmonary artery.

== Disorder: patent ductus arteriosus ==
The human adult heart, showing a patent ductus arteriosus connecting the pulmonary trunk to the arch of aorta

=== Consequences ===
Failure of the ductus arteriosus to close after birth results in a condition called patent ductus arteriosus, which results in the abnormal flow of blood from the aorta to the pulmonary artery: a left-to-right shunt. If left uncorrected, this usually leads to pulmonary hypertension followed by right ventricular heart failure, as well as possible cardiac arrhythmias.

=== Role of prostaglandins ===
The "E" series of prostaglandins are responsible for maintaining the openness of the ductus arteriosus (by dilation of vascular smooth muscle) throughout the fetal period. Prostaglandin E2 (PGE_{2}), produced by both the placenta and the DA itself, is the most potent of the E prostaglandins, but prostaglandin E1 (PGE_{1}) also has a role in keeping the DA open. PGE_{1} and PGE_{2} keep the ductus arteriosus open via involvement of specific PGE-sensitive receptors (such as EP4 and EP2). EP4 is the major receptor associated with PGE_{2}-induced dilation of the DA and can be found across the DA in smooth muscle cells. Immediately after birth, the levels of both PGE_{2} and the EP4 receptors reduce significantly, allowing for closure of the DA and establishment of normal postnatal circulation.

=== Role of non-steroidal anti-inflammatory drugs ===
Ductus arteriosus closure may be induced by administration of nonsteroidal anti-inflammatory drugs (NSAIDs), which inhibit prostaglandin production. The most common NSAID used is Indomethacin, which is usually administered in the first week after birth. However, in the presence of a congenital defect with impaired lung perfusion (e.g. Pulmonary stenosis and left-to-right shunt through the ductus), it may be advisable to improve oxygenation by maintaining the ductus open with prostaglandin treatment. However, such treatments are ineffective in an abnormal ductus. Persistence of the ductus may be associated with other abnormalities, and is much more common in females. By inhibiting PGE_{2} formation, EP4 receptor activation will decrease and normal circulation can begin. NSAIDs taken late in pregnancy can cross the placenta and lead to premature closure of the DA in the fetus. In this case, exogenous PDE_{2} can be administered to reverse the effects of the NSAIDs and maintain the patency of the DA for the remainder of the pregnancy.

=== Incidence ===
A patent ductus arteriosus affects approximately 4% of infants with Down syndrome (DS). A failure to thrive is a very common sign of this condition.

=== Maintaining patency ===
In some types of congenital heart defect (e.g., transposition of the great arteries), prostaglandins may be administered to maintain the DA open, allowing for the continual circulation and oxygenation of blood, until surgery can be performed.

== Other animals ==
Ductus arteriosus evolved with the lung in the ancestors of the lungfish as a connection between the pulmonary arteries and dorsal aorta. During embryonic development, reptiles, birds, and mammals all have either one or two paired ductus arteriosi that provide a fetal shunt of blood away from the lungs.
