= Artificial ligament =

Devices to replace damaged ligaments

Artificial ligaments are devices used to replace damaged ligaments. Today, the most common use of artificial ligaments is in anterior cruciate ligament reconstruction. Although autotransplantation remains the most common method of ligament reconstruction, numerous materials and structures were developed to optimize the artificial ligament since its creation in the World War I era. Many modern artificial ligaments are made of synthetic polymers, such as polyethylene terephthalate. Various coatings have been added to improve the biocompatibility of the synthetic polymers. Early artificial ligaments developed in the 1980s were ineffective due to material deterioration. Currently, the Ligament Advanced Reinforcement System (LARS) artificial ligament has been utilized extensively in clinical applications. Tissue engineering is a growing area of research which aims to regenerate and restore ligament function.

== History ==
Artificial ligament research began in the World War I era. In the first documented case of an artificial ligament in 1914, Dr. Corner utilized a piece of silver filament as synthetic graft to reconstruct a ruptured anterior cruciate ligament (ACL). A ligament made of silk was used to replace an ACL in 1918.

In the early 1980s, technological progress in chemistry and materials science promoted the development of medically suitable materials. Doctors utilized these synthetic materials in clinical applications. The Food and Drug Administration (FDA) approved an artificial ligament made of Gore-Tex for use in ACL reconstruction in 1986.

The design of artificial ligaments in the 1980s consisted of two major parts: a relatively stiff cable or tape, and silicone rubber cylinders on one or both ends. The cable or tape was usually made of polyethylene, nylon or carbon fiber. The silicone rubber cylinder varied in size to fit different sized patients. Theoretically, the flexibility of the silicone rubber would allow some deformation under relatively low loads, and the artificial ligament would stiffen to maintain its shape under higher loads. Practically, this design never achieved its goal to mimic the property of a natural ligament. The mechanical performance of the artificial ligaments was inadequate for widespread clinical application. In the long term, performance loss, complications, and failure occurred.

Material deterioration contributed to the ineffectiveness of early artificial ligaments. Issues would occur in the months and years following treatment. J.E. Paulos indicated in a report about Gore-Tex usage in ACL reconstruction: "Early results of the Gore-Tex prosthesis used for ACL reconstruction showed low rates of failure. Unfortunately, with extended follow-up, our rate of complications continues to increase. Mechanical failure, effusions, and infections continue to occur". At the time, the materials used in artificial ligaments could not sustain adequate mechanical performance. For many of these materials, their mechanical performance diminished in the long-term.

== Current design ==
The primary usage of modern artificial ligaments is in anterior cruciate ligament reconstruction. Many artificial ligaments seek to mimic or exceed the performance of the native ACL. The mechanical performance of an artificial ligament can be characterized by abrasion resistance, withstanding flexural and rotational fatigue, and preventing graft slippage or rupture. Biocompatibility is important to the performance of the artificial ligament in vivo. Biocompatibility is related to new tissue ingrowth, fibroblast migration, osseointegration of bone, reduction of inflammation, preventing scar tissue infiltration, and improving hydrophilicity. Tissue ingrowth and fibroblast migration have been shown to improve the mechanical strength of the artificial ligament, and osseointegration with the surrounding bone can reduce the likelihood of graft slippage. Many artificial ligaments are designed to minimize inflammation and scar tissue infiltration because they can hinder the mechanical strength and can cause graft rupture. Artificial ligament design strives to improve hydrophilicity because hydrophobicity can trigger the host's natural response to foreign bodies.

The Ligament Advanced Reinforcement (LARS) is a leading artificial ligament in ACL repair surgery. They are made of polyethylene terephthalate (PET). They consist of an intraosseous and an intra-articular portion. The intraosseous section consists of longitudinal fibers bounded by a knitted transverse structure. This knitted structure can help prevent deformation and abrasion. The intra-articular portion is made of longitudinal fibers pretwisted at a 90 degree angle. This section is designed to resist fatigue and promote tissue ingrowth. Leeds Keio ligaments consist of a polyester mesh structure. It seeks to mimic the mechanical properties of the native ACL. The porous nature of the ligament can promote tissue ingrowth which has been shown to improve mechanical properties. The PGA Dacron artificial graft consists of 75% braided biodegradable polyglycolic acid and 25% permanent Dacron thread. The Kennedy LAD artificial ligament is made of polypropylene ribbons. It is designed to promote tissue ingrowth and the progressive transfer of load onto the new ligament.

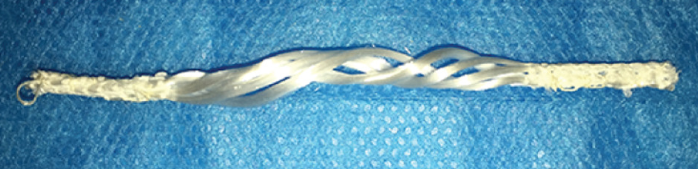
Ligament Advanced Reinforcement System (LARS) artificial ligament. The two end sections are the intraosseous portions and center portion is the intra-articular region.

The native ACL of a human has a tensile strength on the order of kilonewtons, and an elongation at failure of approximately 10%. The mechanical properties of the native ACL vary throughout the human population. The strength of a child's ACL tends to be greater than that of an adult. PGA Dacron artificial ligaments have an ultimate tensile strength near 3500 N and a mean ultimate elongation of approximately 20%. Kennedy LAD ligaments have a tensile strength at failure of approximately 1500 N and an approximate stiffness of 50 N/mm. Leeds-Keio artificial ligaments have an ultimate tensile strength near 2000 N and a stiffness around 250 N/mm after tissue ingrowth. LARS artificial ligaments have varying mechanical properties depending on the amount of fibers used. A higher gauged ligament will have a greater tensile strength. During testing, a 60 gauge LARS ligament exhibited an ultimate tensile strength of 2500 N while a 120 gauge ligament exhibited a tensile strength of 5600 N. The ingrown tissue has been shown to improve viscoelastic properties and reduce friction.

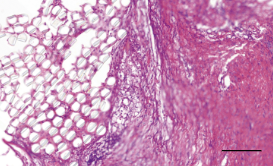
PET artificial ligament coated with hyaluronic acid coating. Collagen tissue infiltration is evident.

Coatings have been added to artificial ligaments to improve their biocompatibility. 58S bioglass and hydroxyapatite coatings have been shown to improve osseointegration and cellular activity in vitro and in animal studies when deposited onto PET ligaments using the soaking method. Hydroxypropyl cellulose surface treatments have been shown to improve osseointegration for PET ligaments in animal studies. Uncoated PET is hydrophobic, so coatings are designed to improve hydrophilicity. Hyaluronic acid coatings can reduce hydrophobicity and have been shown to reduce scar tissue formation and inflammation in vivo. Hyaluronic acid and chitosan composite coatings can be deposited onto artificial ligament surfaces by the layer-by-layer technique, and they have been shown to enhance new bone formation at the ligament interface in mice. The chitosan is used to reduce hydrophobicity and improve osseointegration and mineral deposition, while the hyaluronic acid promotes cell differentiation and growth. Poly(sodium styrene sulfonate) coatings have been shown in animal studies to improve knee functionality and mimicry of the native ACL.

== Clinical application ==
The anterior cruciate ligament (ACL) is a frequently injured human body structure that may cause secondary damages to the knees, such as meniscal tears and articular cartilage degeneration, without medical treatment. ACL reconstruction is a commonly practiced technique for ACL injury, conducted on 30% of patients, which manages to restore stability to the knee structure. Traditional ACL reconstructions uses autografts or allografts which demand a long rehabilitation time and in most cases, develop donor morbidity in the long term.

The early interests in artificial ligaments led to the implementation of non-human tissue, such as Proplast ligaments made of Teflon and carbon fibers and Polyflex made of polypropylene. The results demonstrated poor resistance to torsion forces. Approved by FDA in 1986 and adopted in clinics later, Gore-Tex cruciate ligament prosthesis demonstrated low rates of mechanical failure but high rates of rupture in follow-up. Gore-Tex was then abandoned in ACL surgery and Leeds-Keio (LK) ligament was then adopted. In the later long term follow-up research, LK ligament demonstrated promising performance at first but still showed low stability rates in 2 years and increased degenerative changes compared with their opposite joint in one decade. In the 21st century, the Ligament Advanced Reinforcement (LARS) ligament became the most popular artificial ligament on the market. LARS ligaments not only provide satisfactory outcomes initially but also do not perform differently in at least 2 years. LARS ligaments demonstrate higher stability and lower morbidity rate compared to autograft in short-term research and in a 9-year study, LARS ligament showed a 100% survival rate. Synthetic ACL grafts always develop creep, fatigue and failure so the demand for synthetic grafts with sufficient supply, satisfactory mechanical properties, and low morbidity rate is essentially high. Currently, the LARS ligament is the most comparable to both autografts and other synthetic grafts.

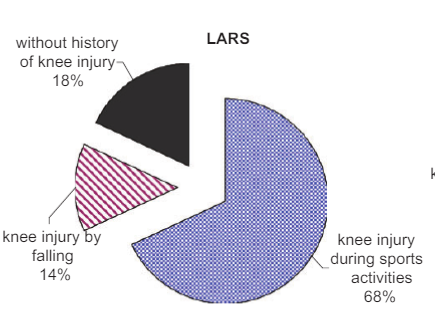
Rate of knee injury among patients with failed ligament augmentation and reconstruction system

Complications that commonly occur in the artificial ligaments after the first ten years are breakage, wear debris, synovitis, recurrent instability, osteolysis and chronic effusions. Complications do not commonly surface right after the surgery or after a relatively short term, and in a few cases, start to show up after the first ten years. Follow-up research is required to study the performance of certain synthetic materials for artificial ligament and to monitor the health of patients. Rupture rates are usually recorded in 2 to 5 years.

== Tissue engineering ==
While the future of artificial ligaments is unknown, leading researchers in tissue engineering aim to regenerate and repair the ligament to restore normal function. ACL tissue engineering will be based on the healing of the medial collateral ligament (MCL), since the ACL does not heal naturally. A seed cell will be used in tissue engineering for the repair of ACL ligaments. The seed cell must have qualifications such as: easily available, potent to proliferate, and efficient in elaborating a mature extracellular matrix. Stem cells such as bone marrow-derived mesenchymal stem cells, adipose-derived stem cells, perivascular stem cells, and human foreskin fibroblasts are commonly used in tissue engineering.
