= Paraumbilical veins =

Details

Identifiers
- Latin: venae paraumbilicales
- TA98: A12.3.12.013
- TA2: 5108
- FMA: 71591

In the course of the round ligament of the liver, small paraumbilical veins are found which establish an anastomosis between the veins of the anterior abdominal wall and the portal vein, hypogastric, and iliac veins. These veins include Burrow's veins, and the veins of Sappey – superior veins of Sappey and the inferior veins of Sappey.

The best marked of these small veins is one which commences at the navel (umbilicus) and runs backward and upward in, or on the surface of, the round ligament (ligamentum teres) between the layers of the falciform ligament to end in the left portal vein.

== Pathophysiology ==
In cases of portal hypertension, the paraumbilical veins may become enlarged in order to reduce hepatic portal vein pressure by shunting blood to the superficial epigastric vein. The superficial epigastric vein drains to the femoral vein which ultimately drains into the inferior vena cava directly through the external iliac and common iliac vein, thereby bypassing the liver. Dilation of this particular portacaval anastomosis results in what is referred to as caput medusae.
