= Jacques Gohory =

French aristocrat, writer, translator and occult philosopher (1520-1576)

Jacques Gohory (1520 – 15 March 1576) was a French aristocrat, writer, translator and occult philosopher. He also went by the Latinized form Jacobus Gohorius, the pseudonyms Orlande de Suave, Leo Suavius, Leo Suavis Solitarius and the initials J.G.P.

Gohory was the first child of Pierre, an advocate with the Parlement of Paris, and wife Catherine de Rivière. Following the family ties to the Parlement, the young Gohory also trained as an advocate and travelled with ambassadors to England, Flanders and Rome with ambassadors before retiring in 1556, while also taking an interest in alchemy and occult sciences. He established an experimental laboratory in 1572 called the Lycium philosophal Sanmarcellin at his home at grand rue Faubourg Sant-Marceau-les-Paris. The establishment also included a garden in which he grew various plants. He wrote a book on the tobacco plant, Instruction sur l'herbe Petum (1572), dedicated to physician Ian Francisque Caraffe, Duke of Arrian, a relative of Pope Paul IV. Gohory and his associates were followers of Paracelsus and his Compendium (1568) noted the work of Jean Fernel, Ambroise Paré, Jean Chapelain, Honoré Castellan, and Leonardo Botal. He took an interest in chemicals likes mercury and antimony. He translated Machiavelli's The Prince (1571) and produced De Vita longa, a commentary on Paracelsus. He may also have been involved in the translation of the Hypnerotomachie, ou Discours du songe de Poliphile (1546). The Jardin du Roi in Paris was modelled along the lines of Gohory's garden.

== Sources ==
- Theatrum Paracelsicum Prefaces and Dedications written by Jacques Gohory
