= Round ligament of liver =

Attaches the liver to the abdominal wall

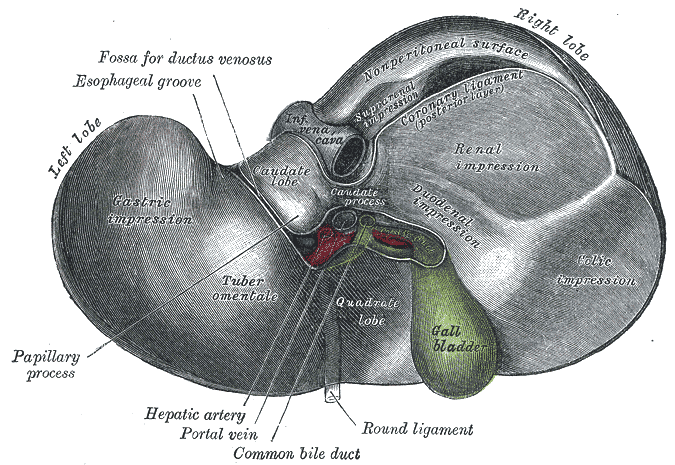
- Liver seen from below, with the round ligament labeled at bottom.

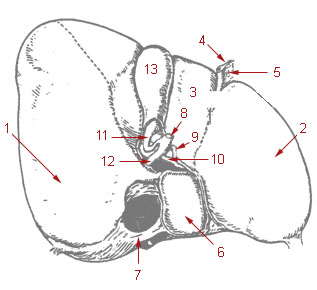
- 1: Right lobe of liver 2: Left lobe of liver 3: Quadrate lobe of liver 4: Round ligament of liver 5: Falciform ligament 6: Caudate lobe of liver 7: Inferior vena cava 8: Common bile duct 9: Hepatic artery 10: Portal vein 11: Cystic duct 12: Hepatic duct 13: Gallbladder

Details
- Precursor: Left umbilical vein

Identifiers
- Latin: ligamentum teres hepatis
- MeSH: D000069592
- TA98: A05.8.01.015
- TA2: 5104
- FMA: 14079

The round ligament of the liver, ligamentum teres or ligamentum teres hepatis is a ligament that forms part of the free edge of the falciform ligament of the liver. It connects the liver to the umbilicus. It is the remnant of the left umbilical vein. The round ligament divides the left part of the liver into medial and lateral sections.

== Structure ==
The round ligament connects the liver to the umbilicus. It divides the left part of the liver into medial and lateral sections.

=== Development ===
The round ligament of the liver is the remnant of the umbilical vein during embryonic development. It only exists in placental mammals. After the child is born, the umbilical vein degenerates to fibrous tissue.

The left portal vein (which gives branches to paraumbilical veins) is connected to the round ligament (ligamentum teres) and ligamentum venosum.

== Clinical significance ==
=== Portal hypertension ===
In adulthood, small paraumbilical veins remain in the substance of the ligament. These act as an important portacaval anastomosis in severe portal hypertension, resulting in a caput medusae.

=== Abscess ===
Very rarely, the round ligament of the liver may develop an abscess. This usually requires liver surgery to treat.

=== Landmark ===
The umbilical vein/round ligament inserts around the umbilicus, and is an important landmark of the inner surface of the anterior abdominal wall.

== Additional images ==
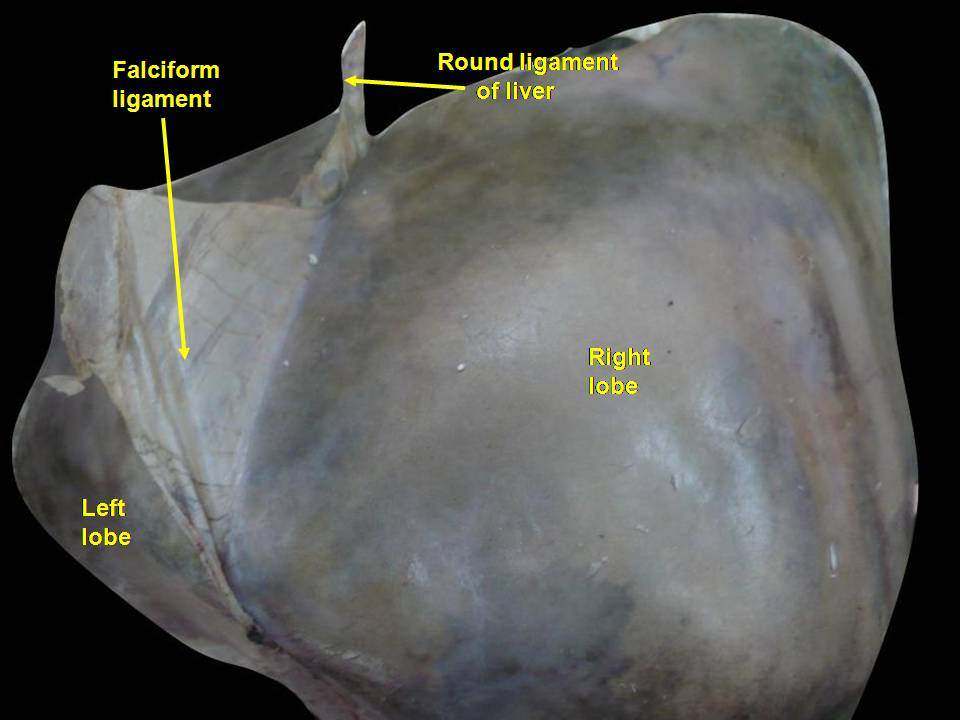
Round ligament of liver. Superior surface of liver.

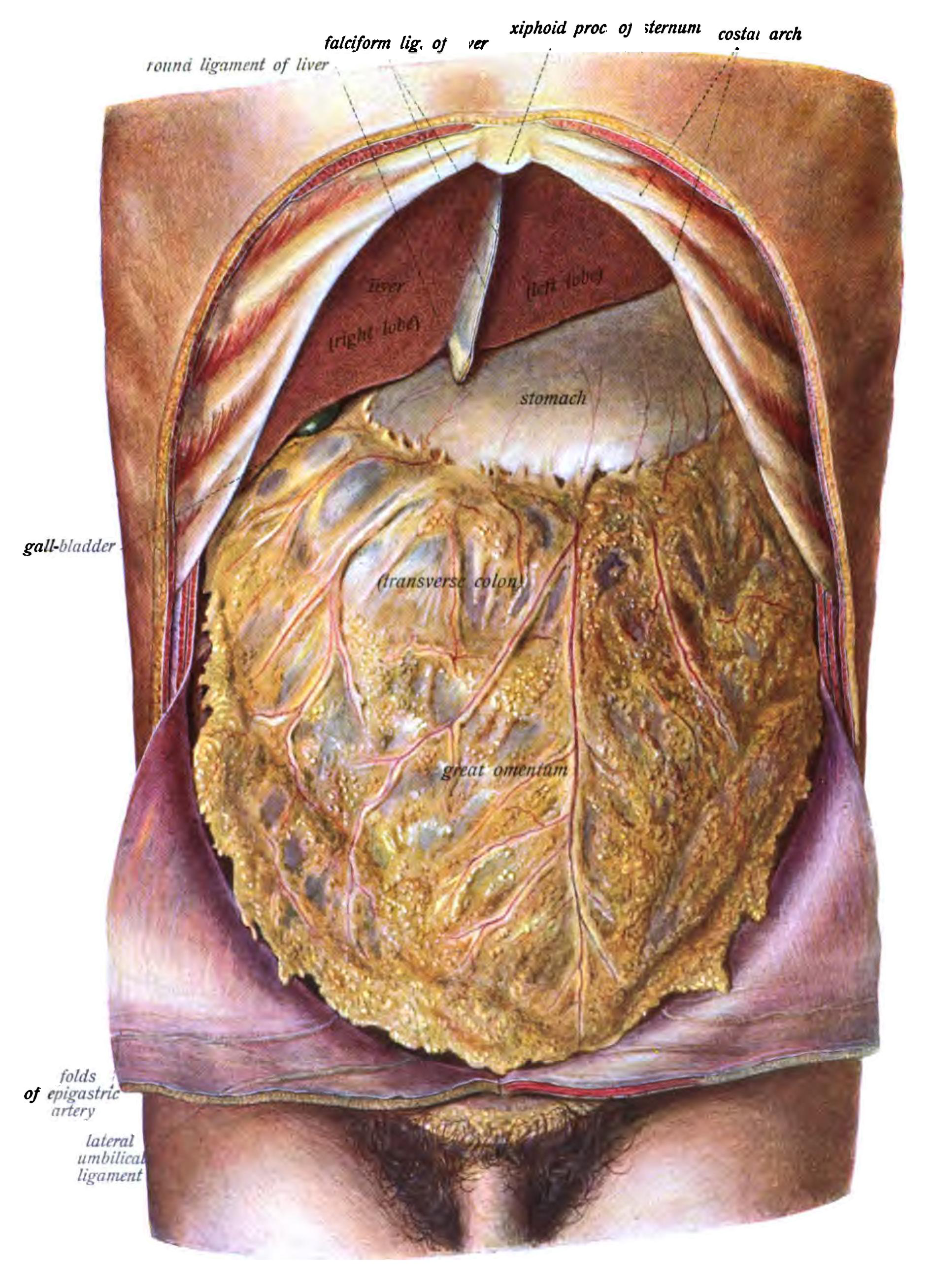
Picture showing the round ligament of liver in situ.

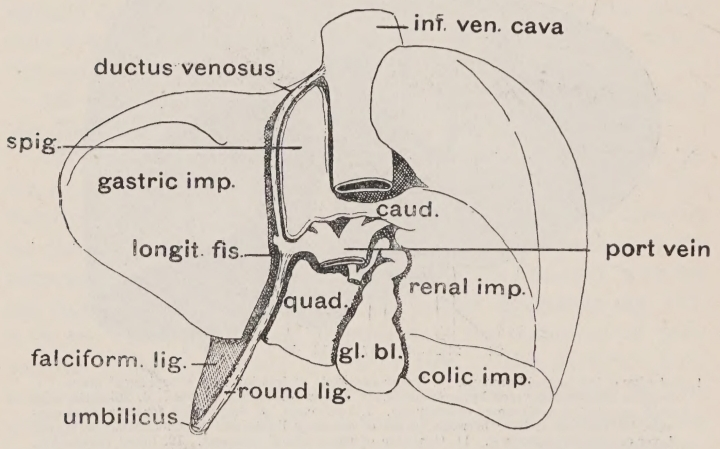
Sketch depicting the round ligament of liver and the surrounding anatomy (after Hughes' Anatomy).

== See also ==
- Ligamentum venosum
- Ligamentum arteriosum
