= Ductus venosus =

Vein in the human fetus

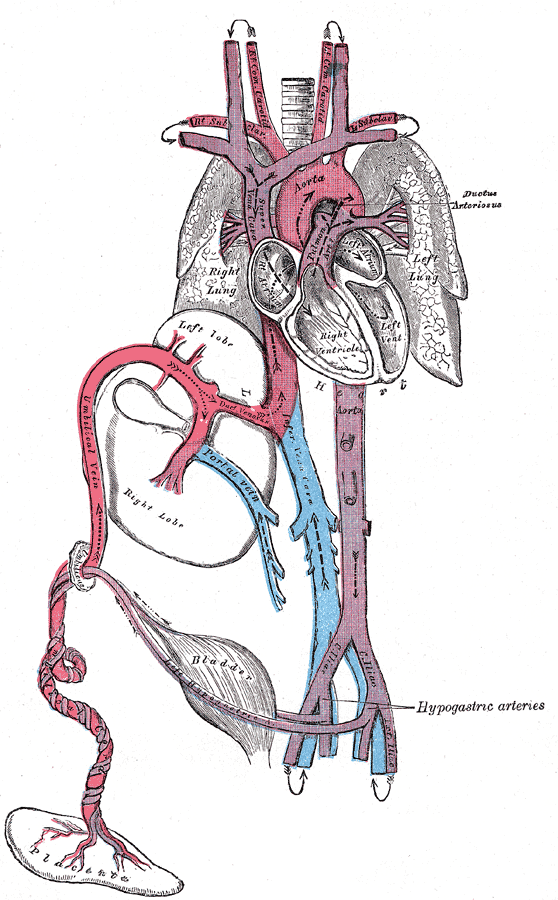
- Fetal circulation. The ductus venosus (red) connects the umbilical vein to the inferior vena cava.

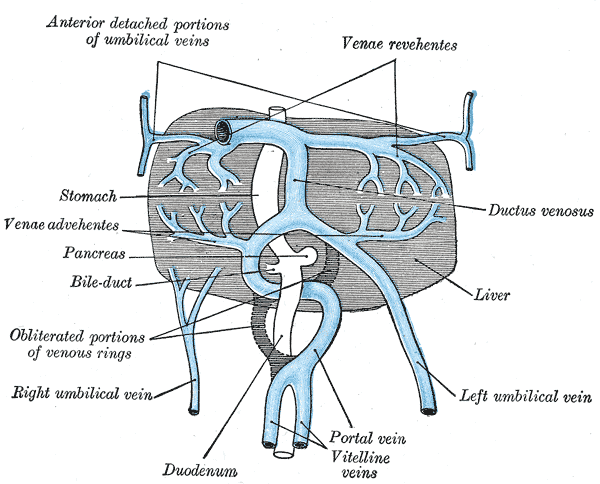
- The liver and the veins in connection with it, of a human embryo, twenty-four or twenty-five days old, as seen from the ventral surface.

Details
- Source: Umbilical vein
- Drains to: Inferior vena cava
- Artery: Ductus arteriosus

Identifiers
- Latin: ductus venosus

In the fetus, the ductus venosus ("DV"; Arantius' duct after Julius Caesar Aranzi) shunts a portion of umbilical vein blood flow directly to the inferior vena cava. Thus, it allows oxygenated blood from the placenta to bypass the liver. Compared to the 50% shunting of umbilical blood through the ductus venosus found in animal experiments, the degree of shunting in the human fetus under physiological conditions is considerably less, 30% at 20 weeks, which decreases to 18% at 32 weeks, suggesting a higher priority of the fetal liver than previously realized. In conjunction with the other fetal shunts, the foramen ovale and ductus arteriosus, it plays a critical role in preferentially shunting oxygenated blood to the fetal brain. It is a part of fetal circulation.

== Anatomic course ==
The pathway of fetal umbilical venous flow is

umbilical vein $\rightarrow$ left portal vein $\rightarrow$ ductus venosus $\rightarrow$ inferior vena cava $\rightarrow$ eventually right atrium.

This anatomic course is important to recall when assessing the success of neonatal umbilical venous catheterization, as failure to cannulate through the ductus venosus results in malpositioned hepatic catheterization via the left or right portal veins. Complications of such positioning can include hepatic hematoma or abscess.

== Postnatal closure ==
The ductus venosus is open at the time of birth, and that is the reason why a catheter inserted into the umbilical vein (umbilical vein catheterization / "UVC") can reach the inferior vena cava; absent a patent DV, such a catheter would continue into the portal vein. The ductus venosus naturally closes during the first week of life in most full-term neonates; however, it may take much longer to close in pre-term neonates. Functional closure occurs within minutes of birth. Structural closure in term babies occurs within 3 to 7 days.

After the ductus venosus closes, its remnant is known as ligamentum venosum.

If the ductus venosus fails to occlude after birth, it remains patent (open), and the individual is said to have a patent ductus venosus and thus an intrahepatic portosystemic shunt (PSS). This condition is hereditary in some dog breeds (e.g. Irish Wolfhound). The ductus venosus shows a delayed closure in preterm infants, with no significant correlation to the closure of the ductus arteriosus or the condition of the infant. Possibly, increased levels of dilating prostaglandins leads to a delayed occlusion of the vessel.

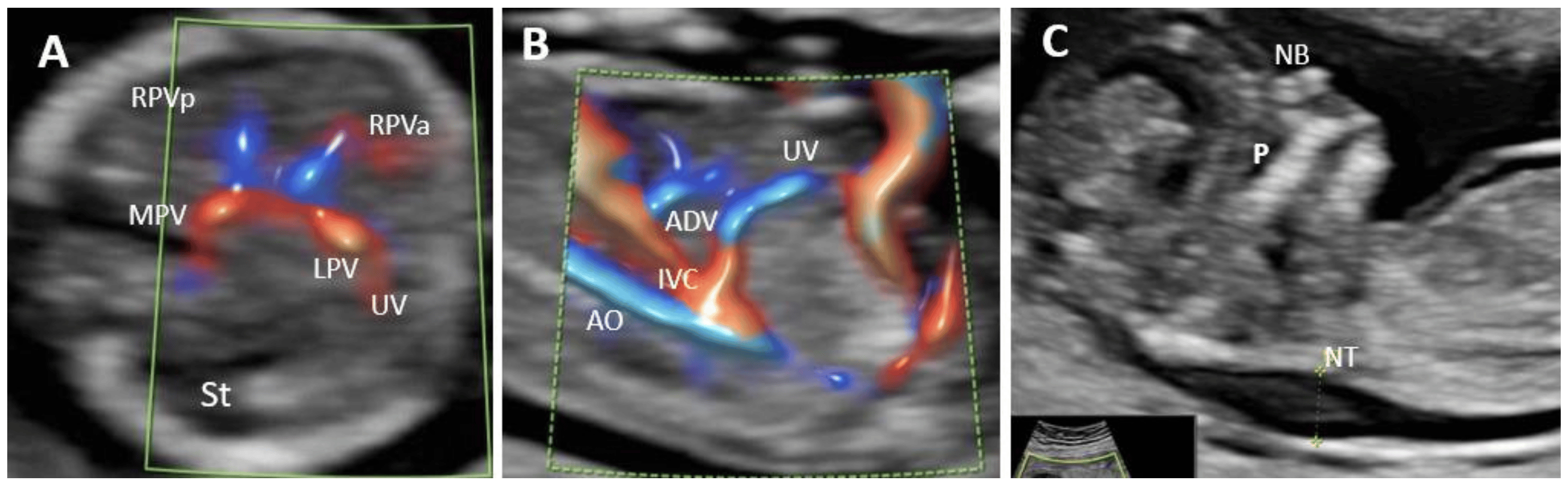
Agenesis of ductus venosus (ADV) in a first trimester case with umbilical vein drainage into inferior vena cava (IVC) and increased nuchal translucency. (A): Transverse plane of the FT fetal abdomen, with high-definition directional power Doppler applied. An ”H”-shaped variant of the intrahepatic portal veins connection is identified; (B): high-definition directional power Doppler in the sagittal plane of the fetal abdomen (same case) showing ADV with umbilical vein drainage into the inferior vena cava; (C): mid-sagittal view of the fetal face with the measurement of the thickened NT. MPV main portal vein, St stomach, LPV left portal vein, UV umbilical vein, RPVa anterior branch of right portal vein, RPVp posterior branch of right portal vein, Ao aorta, IVC inferior vena cava, ADV ductus venosus agenesis, P palate, NB nasal bone, NT nuchal translucency.
