= Ligamentum venosum =

Part of the fetal circulation in humans

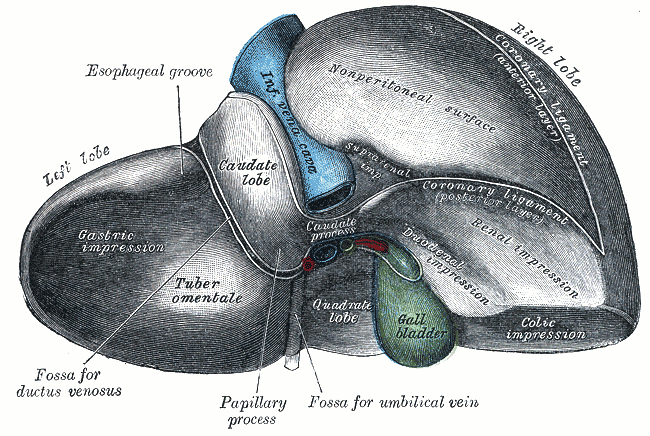
- The ligamentum venosum courses along the visceral/posterior aspect of the liver in the fossa for ductus venosum, which separates the caudate lobe and the left lobe.

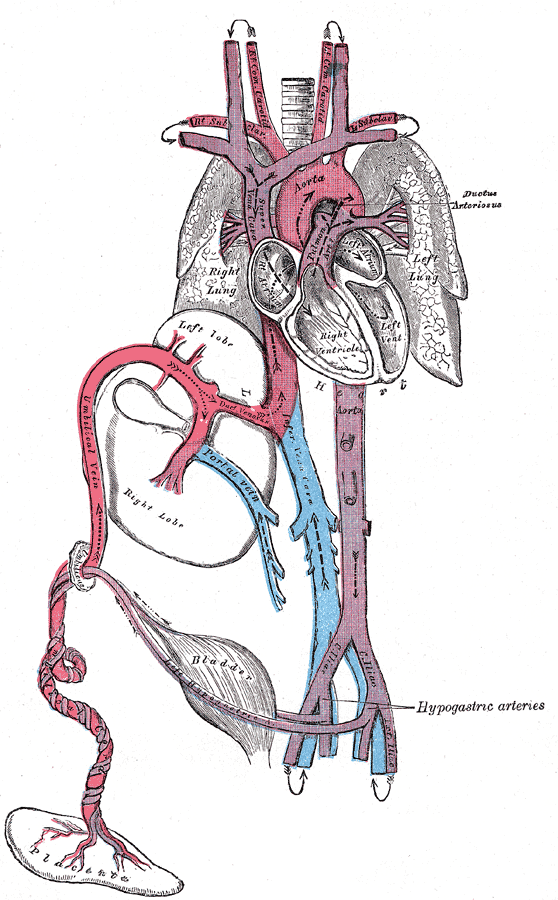
- Fetal circulation. The ductus venosus (red), which becomes the ligamentum venosum, connects the umbilical vein to the inferior vena cava.

Details
- Synonyms: Arantius' ligament, Ligamentum venosum Arantii
- Precursor: Ductus venosus

Identifiers
- Latin: ligamentum venosum
- TA98: A05.8.01.011
- TA2: 5101
- FMA: 14080

The ligamentum venosum, also known as Arantius' ligament, is the fibrous remnant of the ductus venosus of the fetal circulation. Usually, it is attached to the left branch of the portal vein within the porta hepatis. It may be continuous with the round ligament of liver.

It is invested by the peritoneal folds of the lesser omentum within a fissure on the visceral/posterior surface of the liver between the caudate and main parts of the left lobe.

It is grouped with the liver in Terminologia Anatomica.

== See also ==
- Ligamentum teres
- Ligamentum arteriosum
