= Leonardo Botallo =

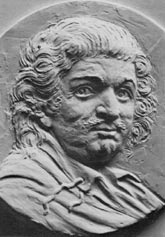

Leonardo Botallo or Leonardi Botalli Astensis in Latin (1530 – c. 1587) was an Italian anatomist who is remembered in the eponymous foramen Botalli which allows blood in the fetal heart of humans to move from the left to the right atrium and the ductus Botalli connecting the pulmonary artery to the proximal descending aorta although both are now thought to be incorrectly attributed to him as these were added in posthumous editions of his work. He published several treatises including De curandis vulneribus sclopettorum (1560) which examined gunshot wounds and questioned the contemporary theory that gunshot wounds were to be treated as if they were poisoned.

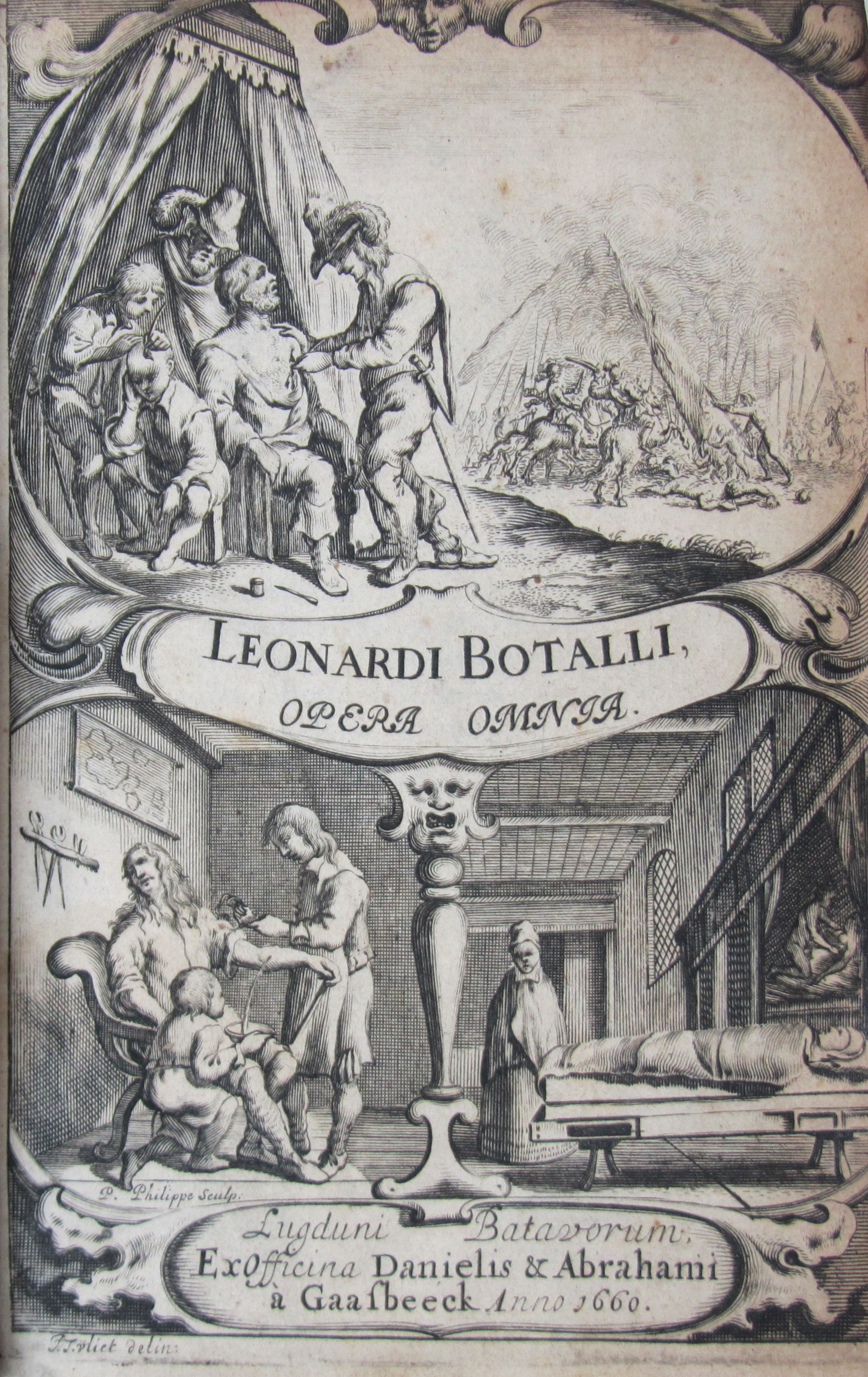
Cover of Opera omnia medica et chirurgica (1660 edition)

== Biography ==
Botallo was born in Asti in a noble family ("Botal" means barrel and could suggest a family history of trade in wine). He studied at the University of Pavia, graduating in medicine around 1543 with lessons under Gabriele Falloppio (1523-1562). A brother was a professor of surgery at Pavia University under whom Botallo practiced. He then worked in the service of French nobility and received the role of counselor to King Henry II around 1550. His adoption of bloodletting as a medical practice earned criticism from Bonaventure Grangier, Jacques Poms and other French physicians. In 1586 he suffered from malaria. He is known for his 1560 treatise on the treatment of wounds from guns, De curandis vulneribus sclopettorum. He also wrote some comments on a code of medical practice Commentarioli duo, alter de medici, alter de aegroti munere. Several of his books were edited and reprinted after his death and they introduce the eponymous ductus Botalli which is correctly termed ductus arteriosus. Botallo may however have been the first to describe a persistent foramen ovale after birth.
