= Caput medusae =

Appearance of distended and engorged superficial epigastric veins

- Other names: Palm tree sign
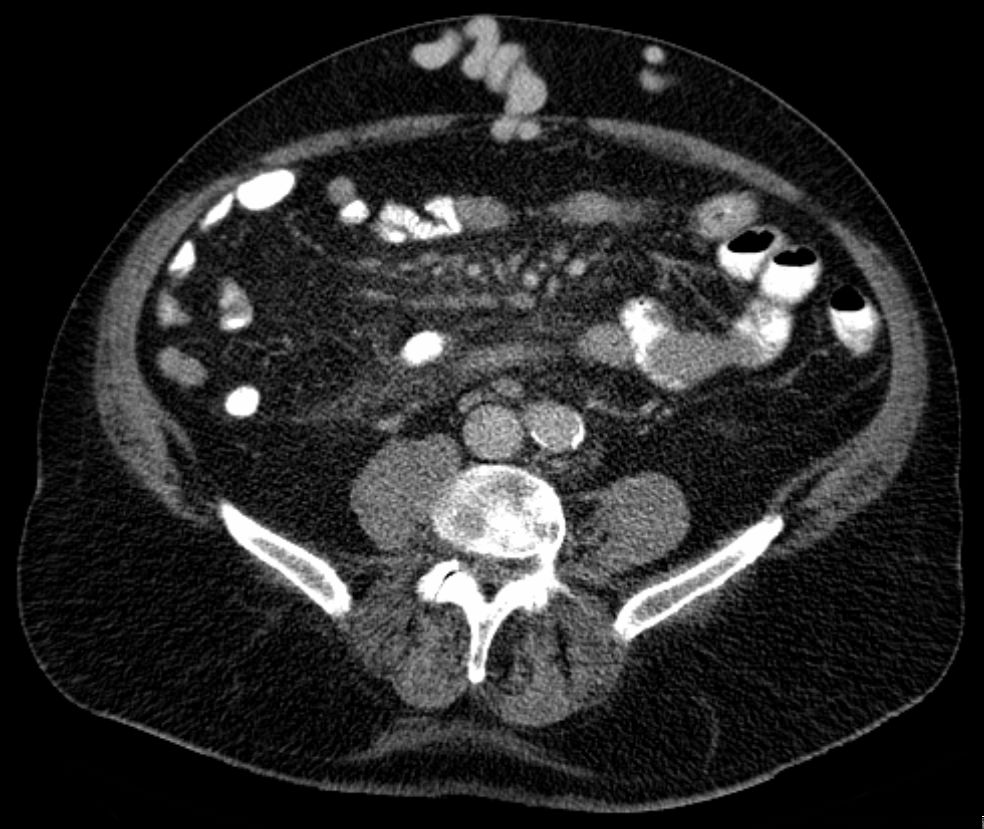

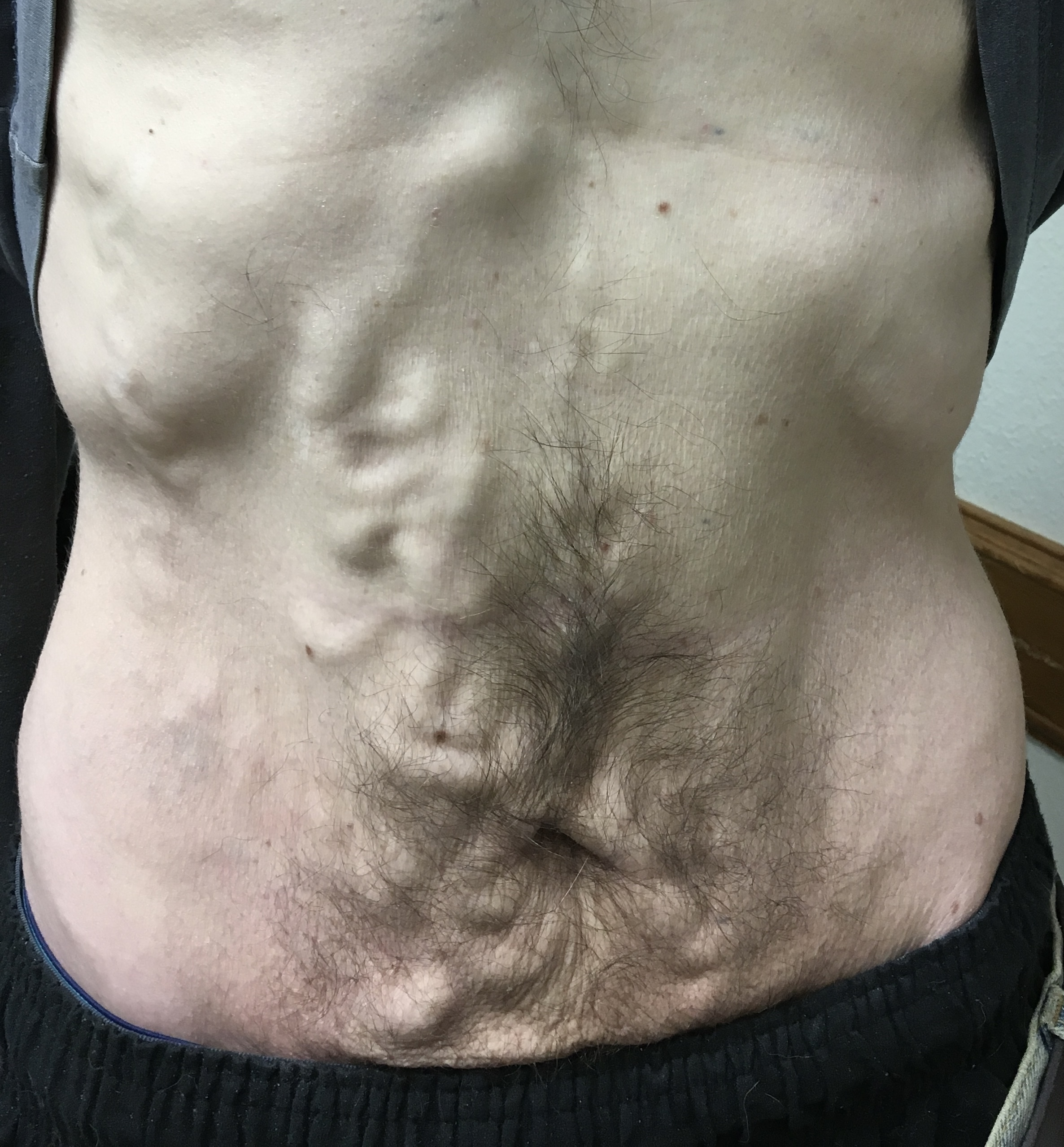
- Axial CT showing portosystemic collateral circulation via the umbilical vein: caput medusae in liver cirrhosis Caput medusae
- Specialty: Gastroenterology

Caput medusae is the appearance of distended and engorged superficial epigastric veins, which are seen radiating from the umbilicus across the abdomen. The name caput medusae (Latin for "head of Medusa") originates from the apparent similarity to Medusa's head, which had venomous snakes in place of hair. It is also a sign of portal hypertension. When the portal vein, that transfers the blood from the gastrointestinal tract to the liver, is blocked, the blood volume increases in the peripheral blood vessels making them appear engorged. It is caused by dilation of the paraumbilical veins, which carry oxygenated blood from mother to fetus in utero and normally close within one week of birth, becoming re-canalised due to portal hypertension caused by formation of scar tissue (fibrosis) in the liver. The appearance is due to cutaneous portosystemic collateral formation between distended and engorged paraumbilical veins that radiate from the umbilicus across the abdomen to join systemic veins.

== Differential diagnosis ==
=== Inferior vena cava obstruction ===
- Produces abdominal collateral veins to bypass the blocked inferior vena cava and permit venous return from the legs.

Determine the direction of flow in the veins below the umbilicus. After pushing down on the prominent vein, blood will:

- flow toward the legs → caput medusae
- flow toward the head → inferior vena cava obstruction.
- Color Doppler ultrasonography is used to differentiate between vena cava obstruction and portal hypertension

== See also ==
- Portacaval anastomosis

In Liver Cirrhosis, the paraumbilical veins open up to transfer portal venous blood into systemic circulation. It results in caput medusae.
