= Protein signalling in heart development =

The heart is the first functional organ in a vertebrate embryo. There are 5 stages to heart development.

== Stages of heart development ==
=== Initiation ===
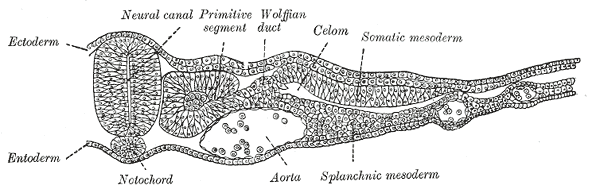

Specification of cardiac precursor cells: The lateral plate mesoderm delaminates to form two layers: the dorsal somatic (parietal) mesoderm and the ventral splanchnic (visceral) mesoderm. The heart precursor cells come from the two regions of the splanchnic mesoderm called the cardiogenic mesoderm. These cells can differentiate into endocardium which lines the heart chamber and valves and the myocardium which forms the musculature of the ventricles and the atria.

The heart cells are specified in anterior mesoderm by proteins such as Dickkopf-related protein 1, Nodal homolog, and Cerberus secreted by the anterior endoderm. Whether Dickkopf-1 and Nodal act directly on the cardiac mesoderm is the subject of research, but it seems that at least they act indirectly by stimulating the production of additional factors from the anterior endoderm. These early signals are essential for heart formation such that removal of the anterior endoderm blocks heart formation. Anterior endoderm is also sufficient to stimulate heart differientation since it can induce non-cardiogenic mesoderm from more posterior positions in the embryo to form heart.

The secretion of Wnt inhibitors (such as Cerberus, Dickkopf and Crescent) by the anterior endoderm also prevents Wnt3a and Wnt8 secreted by the neural tube from inhibiting heart formation. The notochord secretes BMP antagonists (Chordin and Noggin) to prevent formation of cardiac mesoderm in inappropriate places.

Other cardiogenic signals such as BMP and FGF activate the expression of cardiac specific transcription factors such as homeodomain protein Nkx2.5. Nkx2.5 activates a number of downstream transcription factors (such as MEF2 and GATA) which activate the expression of cardiac muscle specific proteins. Mutations in Nkx2.5 result in heart development defects and congenital heart malformations.

=== Step 1: Tube formation ===
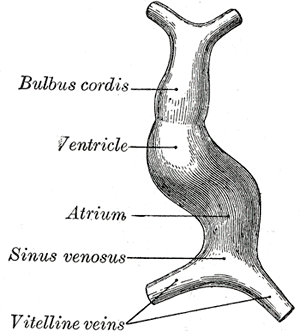

Migration of cardiac precursor cells and fusion of the primordia: The cardiac precursor cells migrate anteriorly towards the midline and fuse into a single heart tube. Fibronectin in the extracellular matrix directs this migration. If this migration event is blocked, cardia bifida results where the two heart primordia remain separated. During fusion, the heart tube is patterned along the anterior/posterior axis for the various regions and chambers of the heart.

The surrounding mesocardium degenerates to leave the primitive heart attached only by its arterial and venous ends, which are anatomically fixed to the pharyngeal arches and the septum transversum, respectively. The developing tubular heart then folds ventrally and bulges in five regions along its length: the first one and closest to the arterial end is the truncus arteriosus, then follow the bulbus cordis, the primitive ventricle, the primitive atrium and the sinus venosus. All five embryonic dilatations of the primitive heart develop into the adult structures of the heart.

=== Step 2: Looping ===
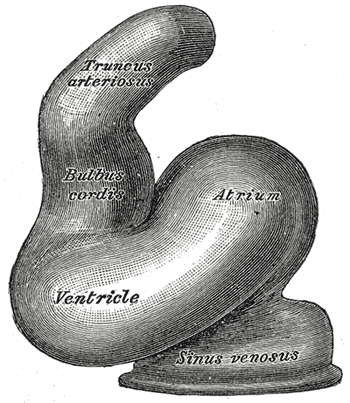

The heart tube undergoes right-ward looping to change from anterior/posterior polarity to left/right polarity. The detailed mechanism is unknown however the looping requires the asymmetrically localized transcription factor Pitx2. The direction of asymmetry is established much earlier during embryonic development, possibly by the clockwise rotation of cilia, and leads to sided expression of Pitx2. Looping also depends on heart specific proteins activated by Nkx2.5 such as Hand1, Hand2, and Xin.

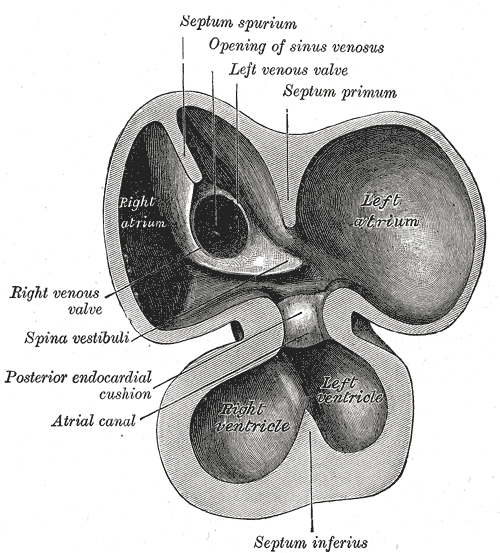

Heart chamber formation: The cell fates of the heart chambers are characterized before heart looping but cannot be distinguished until after looping. Hand1 is localized to the left ventricle while Hand2 is localized to the right ventricle.

=== Step 3: Septal formation ===
Proper positioning and function of the valves is critical for chamber formation and proper blood flow. The endocardial cushion serves as a makeshift valve until then.

==== Step 3(a): Atrial septation ====
The primitive atrium is divided in two by joining of several structures. From the roof of the primitive atrium descends the septum primum, which grows towards the endocardial cushions within the atrial canal. Right before the septum primum fuses with the endocardial cushions there's a temporary space called the foramen primum. Once they fuse a new opening forms in the middle of the septum primum called the ostium secundum or foramen secundum. To the right of the septum primum and also coming down from the roof of the primitive atrium, descends a semilunar-shaped partition called the septum secundum. The free edges of the septum secundum produce an orifice called foramen ovale, which closes after birth when the septum primum and secundum fuse to each other completing the formation of the atrial septum.

The atrial canal is in turn divided into a right and left side by the atrioventricular septum, which originates from the union of the dorsal and ventral endocardial cushion. The right side of the atrial canal will become the tricuspid valve and the left will become the bicuspid valve.

Defects in producing the AV septum produces atrioventricular septal defects, including a persistent AV canal and tricuspid atresia.

==== Step 3(b): Ventricular septation ====
The floor at the midline of the primitive ventricle produces the interventricular septum, separating the chamber in two. The IV septum grows upward towards the endocardial cushion. As it grows, a foramen appears, the interventricular foramen, which later is closed by the non-muscular IV septum.

Defects in producing the IV septum causes ventricular septal defects, which communicate both ventricles.

=== Step 4: Outflow tract septation ===
The truncus arteriosus and the adjacent bulbus cordis partition by means of cells from the neural crest. Once the cells from the truncal ridge meet with the cells from the bulbar ridge they twist around each other in a spiral orientation as they fuse and form the aorticopulmonary septum. This will end dividing the aorta from the pulmonary trunk.

Defects in this process is known as aortopulmonary septal defect, and causes persistent truncus arteriosus, unequal division of the truncus arteriosus, transposition of the great arteries, aortic and pulmonary valve stenosis or tetralogy of fallot.

=== Step 5: Heart valve formation ===
The heart valves are formed.

Defects in this process are known as valvular heart disease.
