= Septum secundum =

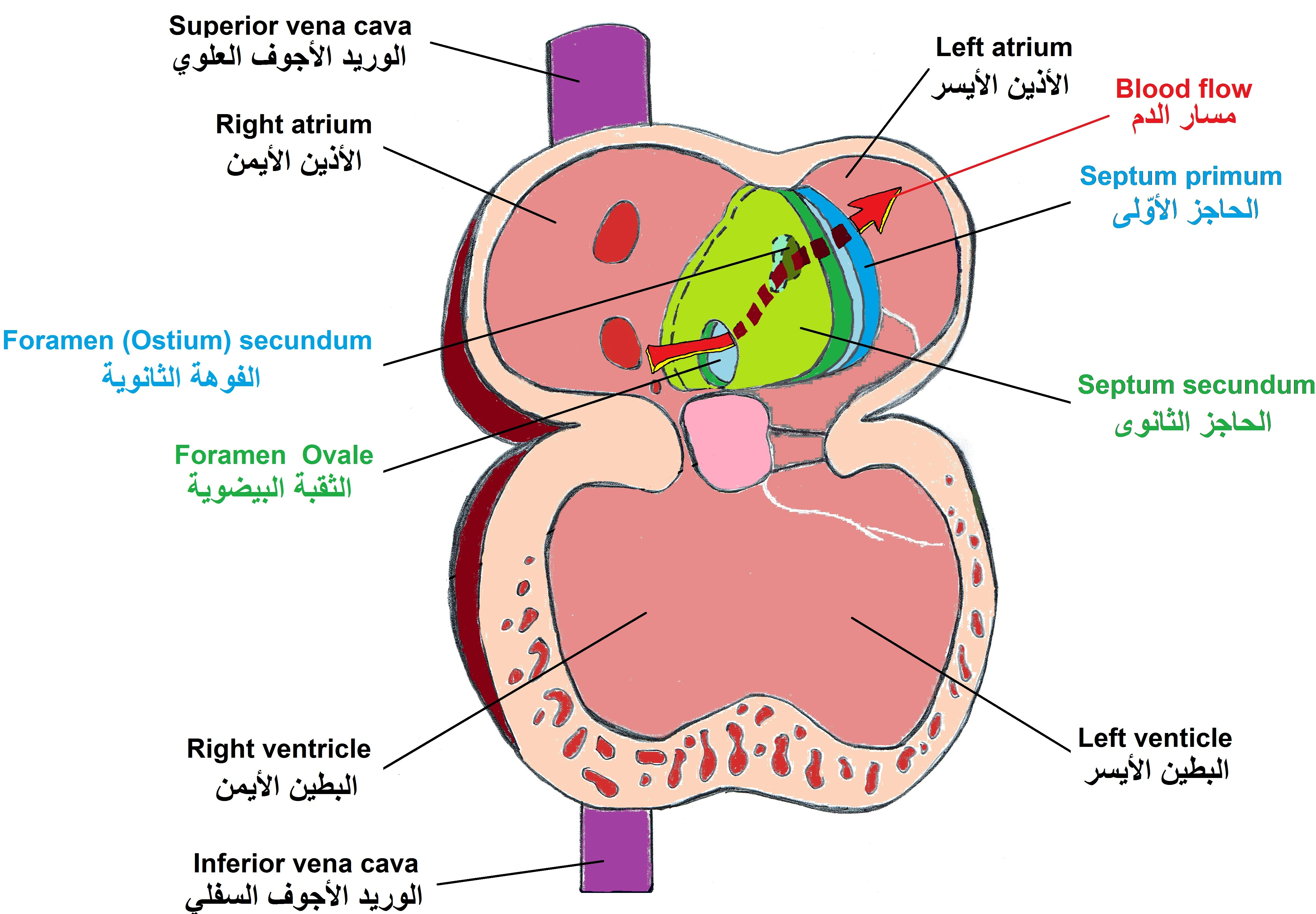
- A labelled diagram of the developing heart, showing the relationship between the septum secundum (by the right atrium) and the septum primum (by the left atrium).

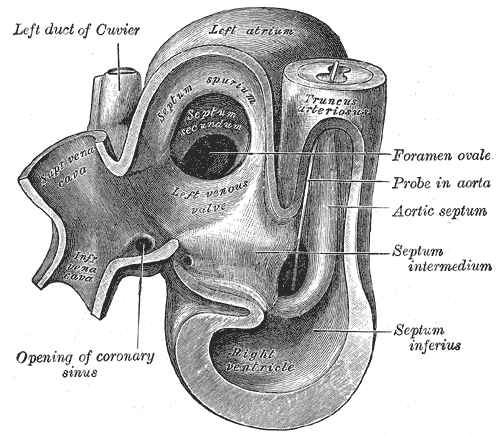
- Same heart as above, opened on right side. (Septum secundum visible in dark area at center top.)

Details
- Carnegie stage: 14
- Days: 33
- Gives rise to: Atrial septum

Identifiers
- Latin: septum secundum

The septum secundum is a muscular flap that is important in heart development. It is semilunar in shape, and grows downward from the upper wall of the atrium immediately to the right of the septum primum and ostium secundum. It is important in the closure of the foramen ovale after birth.

== Structure ==
=== Development ===
At the end of the fifth week of development, the septum secundum grows from the upper wall of the primitive atrium. It grows to the right of the septum primum, which has already started growing. It grows down towards the septum intermedium formed from the endocardial cushions. Before birth, it does not fuse with the septum intermedium, leaving a gap to form the foramen ovale. Shortly after birth, it fuses with the septum primum to form the interatrial septum, and the foramen ovale is closed. The fossa ovalis denotes the free margin of the septum secundum after birth.

== Clinical significance ==
Sometimes, the fusion of the septum secundum to the septum intermedium is incomplete, and the upper part of the foramen remains patent. This creates an atrial septal defect (ASD).
