= Heart development =

Prenatal development of the heart

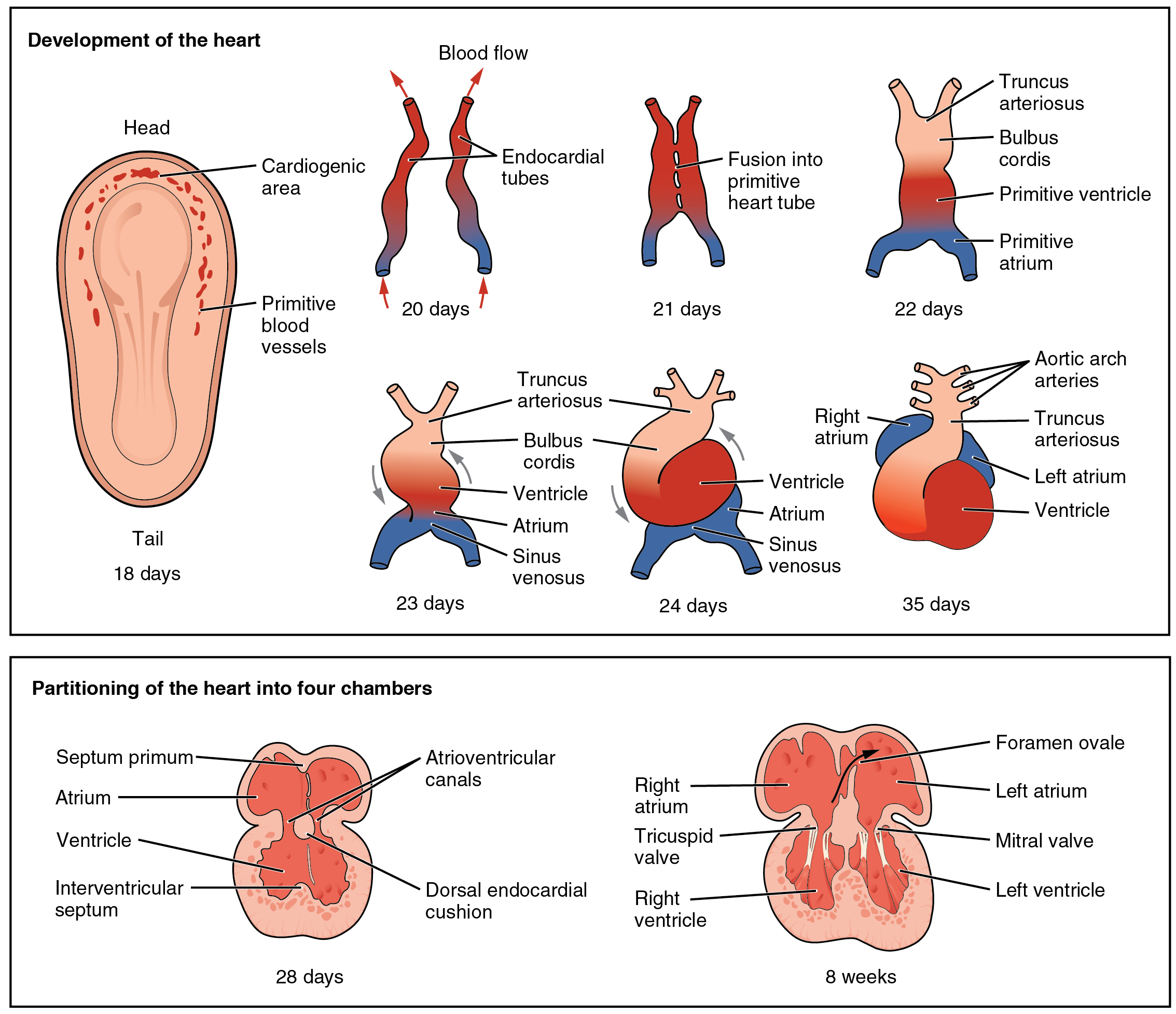
- Development of the human heart during the first five weeks (top), and the formation of the heart chambers (bottom) at four and eight weeks. In this figure, the blue and red colors represent blood inflow and outflow (not venous and arterial blood). Initially, all venous blood flows from the tail/atria to the ventricles/head, a very different pattern from that of an adult.

Details
- Gives rise to: Heart
- System: Fetal circulation, circulatory system

Heart development, also known as cardiogenesis, refers to the prenatal development of the heart. This begins with the formation of two endocardial tubes which merge to form the tubular heart, also called the primitive heart tube. The heart is the first functional organ in vertebrate embryos.

The tubular heart quickly differentiates into the truncus arteriosus, bulbus cordis, primitive ventricle, primitive atrium, and the sinus venosus. The truncus arteriosus splits into the ascending aorta and the pulmonary trunk. The bulbus cordis forms part of the ventricles. The sinus venosus connects to the fetal circulation.

The heart tube elongates on the right side, looping and becoming the first visual sign of left-right asymmetry of the body. Septa form within the atria and ventricles to separate the left and right sides of the heart.

== Early development ==
The heart derives from embryonic mesodermal germ layer cells that differentiate after gastrulation into mesothelium, endothelium, and myocardium. Heart induction occurs in the anterior mesoderm during gastrulation through interactions with adjacent endoderm (both extra-embryonic and definitive) mediated primarily by endogenous inhibitors of WNT signaling such as DKK1. Mesothelial pericardium forms the outer lining of the heart. The inner lining of the heart – the endocardium, lymphatic and blood vessels, develop from endothelium.

=== Endocardial tubes ===
In the splanchnopleuric mesenchyme on either side of the neural plate, a horseshoe-shaped area develops as the cardiogenic region. This has formed from cardiac myoblasts and blood islands as forerunners of blood cells and vessels. By day 19, an endocardial tube begins to develop in each side of this region. These two tubes grow and by the third week have converged towards each other to merge, using programmed cell death to form a single tube, the tubular heart.

From splanchnopleuric mesenchyme, the cardiogenic region develops cranially and laterally to the neural plate. In this area, two separate angiogenic cell clusters form on either side and coalesce to form the endocardial tubes. As embryonic folding starts, the two endocardial tubes are pushed into the thoracic cavity, where they begin to fuse together, and this is completed at about 22 days.

At around 18 to 19 days after fertilisation, the heart begins to form. The heart begins to develop near the head of the embryo in the cardiogenic area. Following cell signalling, two strands or cords begin to form in the cardiogenic region As these form, a lumen develops within them, at which point, they are referred to as endocardial tubes. At the same time that the tubes are forming other major heart components are also being formed. The two tubes migrate together and fuse to form a single primitive heart tube which quickly forms five distinct regions. From head to tail, these are the truncus arteriosus, bulbus cordis, primitive ventricle, primitive atrium, and the sinus venosus. Initially, all venous blood flows into the sinus venosus, and contractions propel the blood from tail to head, or from the sinus venosus to the truncus arteriosus. The truncus arteriosus will divide to form the aorta and pulmonary artery; the bulbus cordis will develop into the right ventricle; the primitive ventricle will form the left ventricle; the primitive atrium will become the front parts of the left and right atria and their appendages, and the sinus venosus will develop into the posterior part of the right atrium, the sinoatrial node and the coronary sinus.

=== Heart tube position ===
The central part of cardiogenic area is in front of the oropharyngeal membrane and the neural plate. The growth of the brain and the cephalic folds push the oropharyngeal membrane forward, while the heart and the pericardial cavity move first to the cervical region and then into the chest. The curved portion of the horseshoe-shaped area expands to form the future ventricular infundibulum and the ventricular regions, as the heart tube continues to expand. The tube starts receiving venous drainage in its caudal pole and will pump blood out of the first aortic arch and into the dorsal aorta through its polar head. Initially the tube remains attached to the dorsal part of the pericardial cavity by a mesodermal tissue fold called the dorsal mesoderm. This mesoderm disappears to form the two pericardial sinuses the transverse and the oblique pericardial sinuses, which connect both sides of the pericardial cavity.

The myocardium thickens and secretes a thick layer of rich extracellular matrix containing hyaluronic acid which separates the endothelium. Then mesothelial cells form the pericardium and migrate to form most of the epicardium. Then the heart tube is formed by the endocardium, which is the inner endothelial lining of the heart, and the myocardial muscle wall which is the epicardium that covers the outside of the tube.

== Heart folding and turning ==
The heart tube continues stretching and by day 23, in a process called morphogenesis, cardiac looping begins. The cephalic portion curves in a frontal clockwise direction. The atrial portion starts moving in a cephalically and then moves to the left from its original position. This curved shape approaches the heart and finishes its growth on day 28. The conduit forms the atrial and ventricular junctions which connect the common atrium and the common ventricle in the early embryo. The arterial bulb forms the trabecular portion of the right ventricle. A cone will form the infundibula blood of both ventricles. The arterial trunk and the roots will form the proximal portion of the aorta and the pulmonary artery. The junction between the ventricle and the arterial bulb will be called the primary intra-ventricular hole. The tube is divided into cardiac regions along its craniocaudal axis: the primitive ventricle, called primitive left ventricle, and the trabecular proximal arterial bulb, called the primitive right ventricle. This time no septum is present in heart.

A functional explanation for the enigmatic turning of the heart and bowels is lacking, but one theory does give an explanation for the evolution and development of this phenomenon. According to this axial twist theory, this is due to a twist in the body of all vertebrates that occurs in the early embryo. The twist turns the anterior head (with the face and cerebrum) clockwise and the rest of the exterior body anticlockwise, such that the vertebrate body is symmetric on the outside. Since there is no evolutionary pressure on the heart and inner organs for bilateral symmetry, these body parts are excluded from the twisting and remain asymmetric.

== Heart chambers ==
=== Sinus venosus ===
In the middle of the fourth week, the sinus venosus receives venous blood from the poles of right and left sinus. Each pole receives blood from three major veins: the vitelline vein, the umbilical vein and the common cardinal vein. The sinus opening moves clockwise. This movement is caused mainly by the left to right shunt of blood, which occurs in the venous system during the fourth and fifth week of development.

When the left common cardinal vein disappears in the tenth week only the oblique vein of the left atrium and the coronary sinus remain. The right pole joins the right atrium to form the wall portion of the right atrium. The right and left venous valves fuse and form a peak known as the septum spurium. At the beginning, these valves are large, but over time the left venous valve and the septum spurium fuse with the developing atrial septum. The upper right venous valve disappears, while the bottom venous valve evolves into the inferior valve of the vena cava and the coronary sinus valve.

=== Heart wall ===
The main walls of the heart are formed between day 27 and 37 of the development of the early embryo. The growth consists of two tissue masses actively growing that approach one another until they merge and split light into two separate conduits. Tissue masses called endocardial cushions develop into atrioventricular and conotruncal regions. In these places, the cushions will help in the formation of auricular septum, ventricular conduits, atrio-ventricular valves and aortic and pulmonary channels.

=== Atria ===
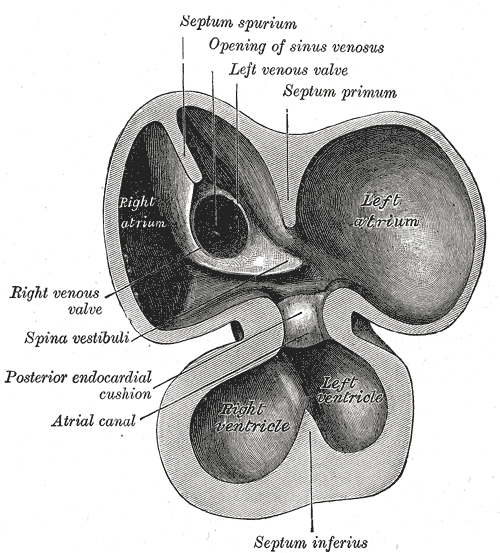
The developing heart at day 30. The septum primum (top, middle) develops downwards to separate the initially joined primitive atrium into left and right atria.

At the end of the fourth week, a crest grows that leaves the cephalic part. This crest is the first part of the septum primum. The two ends of the septum extend into the interior of the endocardial cushions in the atrioventricular canal. The opening between the bottom edge of the septum primum and endocardial cushions is the ostium primum (first opening). The extensions of the upper and lower endocardial pads grow along the margin of the septum primum and close the ostium primum. Coalescence of these perforations will form the ostium secundum (second opening), which allows blood to flow freely from the right atrium to the left.

When the right of the atrium expands due to the incorporation of the pole of the sinus, a new fold appears, called the septum secundum. At its right side it is fused with the left venous valve and the septum spurium. A free opening will then appear, called the foramen ovale. The remains of the upper septum primum, will become the valves of the foramen ovale. The passage between the two atrial chambers consists of a long oblique slit through which blood flows from the right atrium to the left.

=== Ventricles ===
Initially, a single pulmonary vein develops in the form of a bulge in the back wall of the left atrium. This vein will connect with the veins of the developing lung buds. As development proceeds, the pulmonary vein and its branches are incorporated into the left atrium and they both form the smooth wall of the atrium. The embryonic left atrium remains as the trabecular left atrial appendage, and the embryonic right atrium remains as the right atrial appendage.

=== Septum formation of the atrioventricular canal ===
At the end of the fourth week, two atrioventricular endocardial cushions appear. Initially the atrioventricular canal gives access to the primitive left ventricle, and is separated from arterial bulb by the edge of the ventricular bulb. In the fifth week, the posterior end terminates in the center part of the upper endocardial cushion. Because of this, blood can access both the left primitive ventricle and the right primitive ventricle. As the anterior and posterior pads project inwardly, they merge to form a right and left atrioventricular orifice.

=== Atrioventricular valves ===
When forming intra-atrial septa, atrio-ventricular valves will begin to grow. A muscular interventricular septum begins to grow from the common ventricle to the atrio-ventricular endocardial cushions. The division begins in the common ventricle where a furrow in the outer surface of the heart will appear the interventricular foramen eventually disappears. This closure is achieved by further growth of the muscular interventricular septum, a contribution of trunk crest-conal tissue and a membranous component.

== Valves and outflow tracts ==
=== Truncus septum formation and arterial cone ===
The arterial cone is closed by the infundibular cushions. The trunk cones are closed by the forming of an infundibulotroncal septum, which is made from a straight proximal portion and distal spiral portion. Then, the narrowest portion of the aorta is in the left and dorsal portion. The distal portion of the aorta is pushed forward to the right. The proximal pulmonary artery is right and ventral, and the distal portion of the pulmonary artery is in the left dorsal portion.

== Pacemaker and conduction system ==
The rhythmic electrical depolarization waves that trigger myocardial contraction is myogenic, which means that they begin in the heart muscle spontaneously and are then responsible for transmitting signals from cell to cell. Myocytes that were obtained in the primitive heart tube, start beating as they connect together by their walls in a syncytium. Myocytes initiate rhythmic electrical activity, before the fusion of the endocardial tubes. The heartbeat begins in the region of the pacemaker which has a spontaneous depolarization time faster than the rest of myocardium.

The primitive ventricle acts as initial pacemaker. But this pacemaker activity is actually made by a group of cells that derive from the sinoatrial right venous sinus. These cells form an ovoid sinoatrial node (SAN), on the left venous valve. After the development of the SAN, the superior endocardial cushions begin to form a pacemaker also known as the atrioventricular node. With the development of the SAN, a band of specialized conducting cells start to form creating the bundle of His that sends a branch to the right ventricle and one to the left ventricle. Most conduction pathways originate from the cardiogenic mesoderm but the sinus node may be derived from the neural crest.

The human embryonic heart displays cardiac activity approximately 21 days after fertilization, or five weeks after the last normal menstrual period (LMP), which is the date normally used to date pregnancy in the medical community. The electrical depolarizations that trigger cardiac myocytes to contract arise spontaneously within the myocyte itself. The heartbeat is initiated in the pacemaker regions and spreads to the rest of the heart through a conduction pathway. Pacemaker cells develop in the primitive atrium and the sinus venosus to form the sinoatrial node and the atrioventricular node respectively. Conductive cells develop the bundle of His and carry the depolarization into the lower heart. Cardiac activity is visible beginning at approximately 5 weeks of pregnancy.

The human heart begins beating at a rate near the mother's, about 75-80 beats per minute (BPM). The embryonic heart rate (EHR) then accelerates linearly for the first month of beating, peaking at 165-185 BPM during the early 7th week, (early 9th week after the LMP). This acceleration is approximately 3.3 BPM per day, or about 10 BPM every three days, an increase of 100 BPM in the first month.

After peaking at about 9.2 weeks after the LMP, it decelerates to about 150 BPM (+/-25 BPM) during the 15th week after the LMP. After the 15th week the deceleration slows reaching an average rate of about 145 (+/-25 BPM) BPM at term.

== Imaging ==
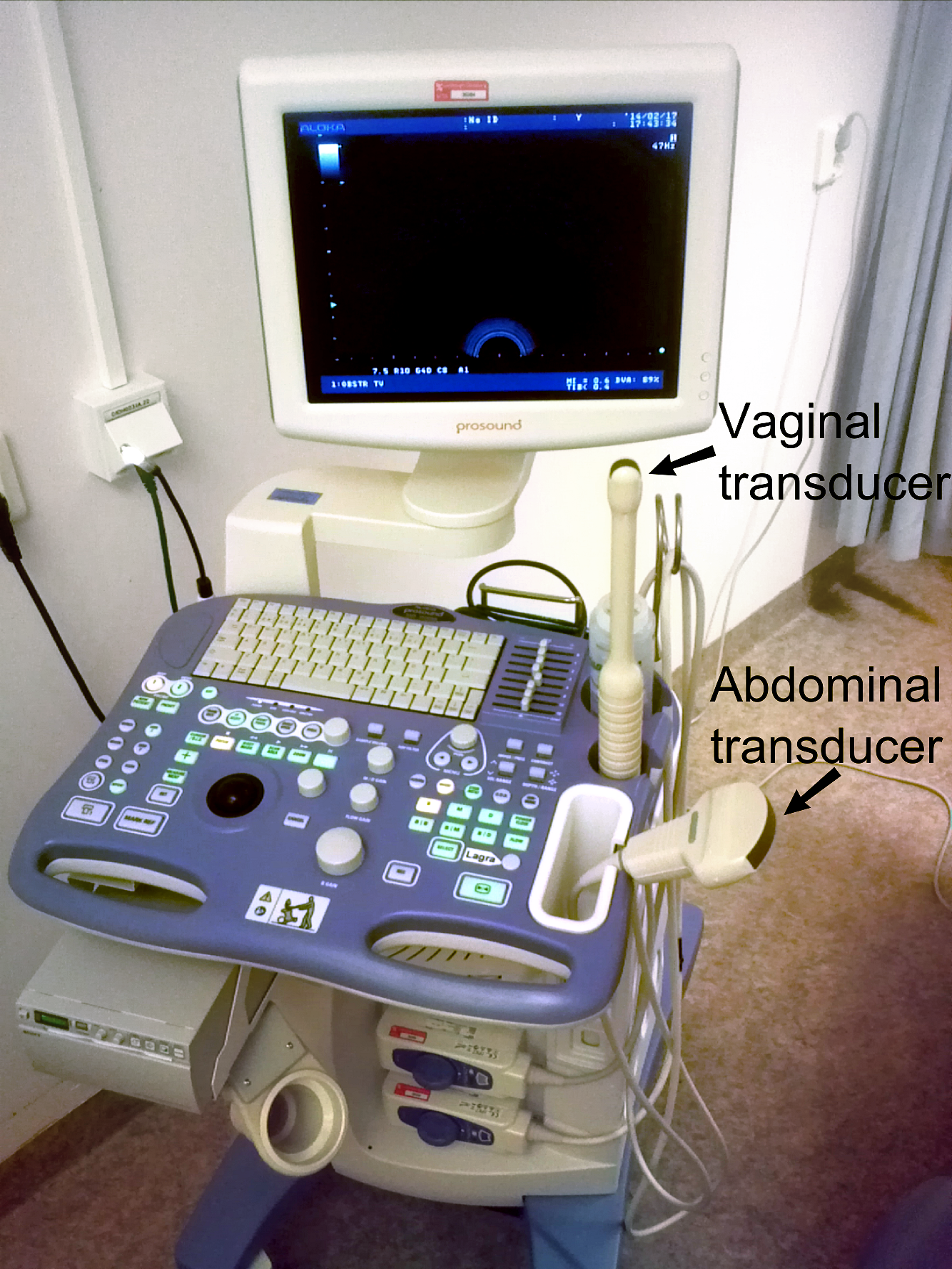
Device for obstetric ultrasonography including usage in 1st trimester.

Transvaginal ultrasonography of an embryo at 5 weeks and 5 days of gestational age, with discernible cardiac activity (arrow).

In the first trimester, cardiac activity can be visualized and the fetal heart motion quantified by obstetric ultrasonography. A study of 32 normal pregnancies showed that fetal heart motion was visible at a mean human chorionic gonadotropin (hCG) level of 10,000 UI/L (range 8650–12,200). Obstetric ultrasonography can also use Doppler technique on key vessels such as the umbilical artery to detect abnormal flow.

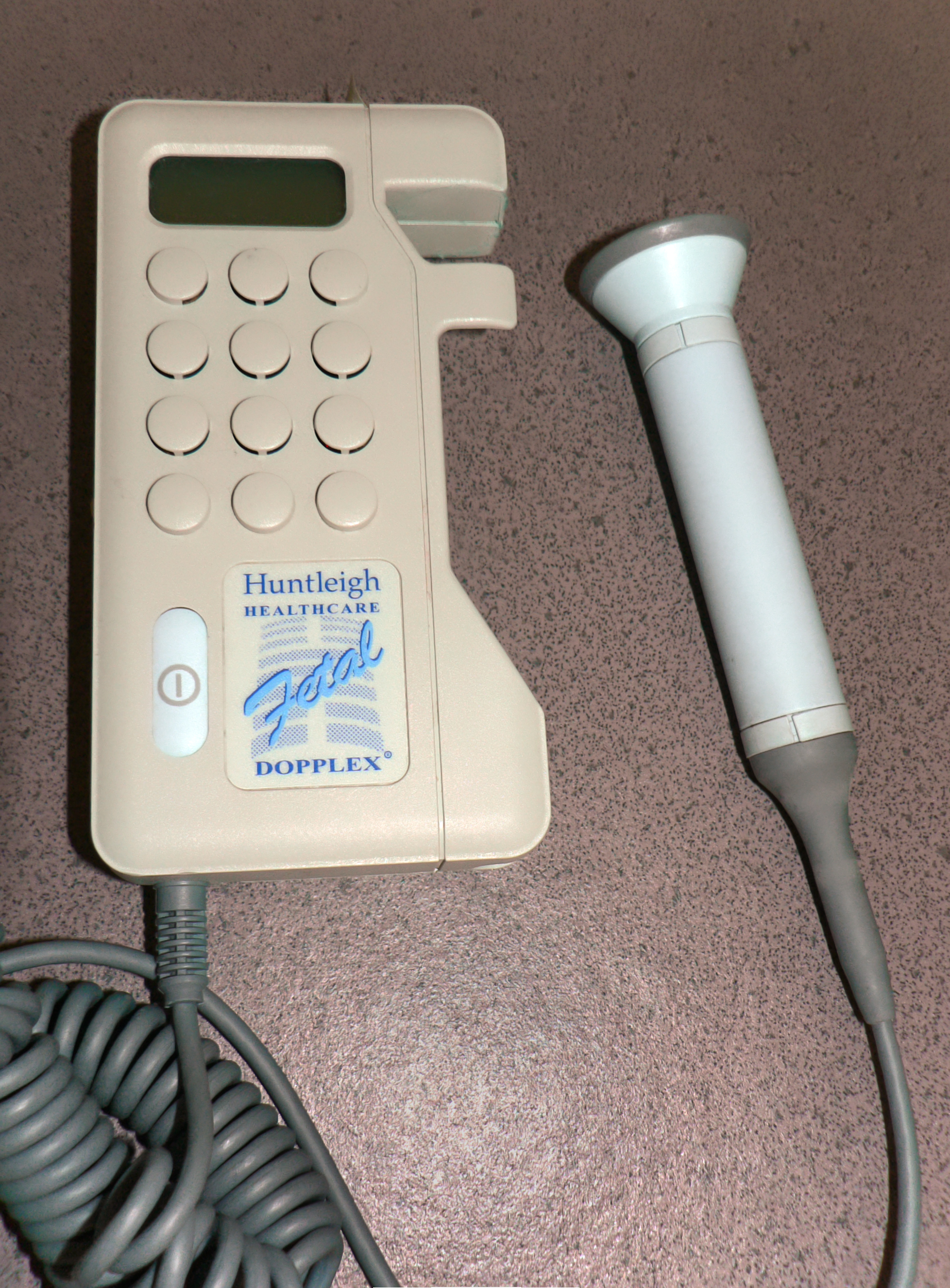
Doppler fetal monitor

In later stages of pregnancy, a simple Doppler fetal monitor can be used to quantify the fetal heart rate.

A fetal heartbeat can be detected at around 17 to 20 weeks of gestation when the chambers of the heart have become sufficiently developed.

During childbirth, the parameter is part of cardiotocography, which is where the fetal heartbeat and uterine contractions are continuously recorded.

== Additional images ==
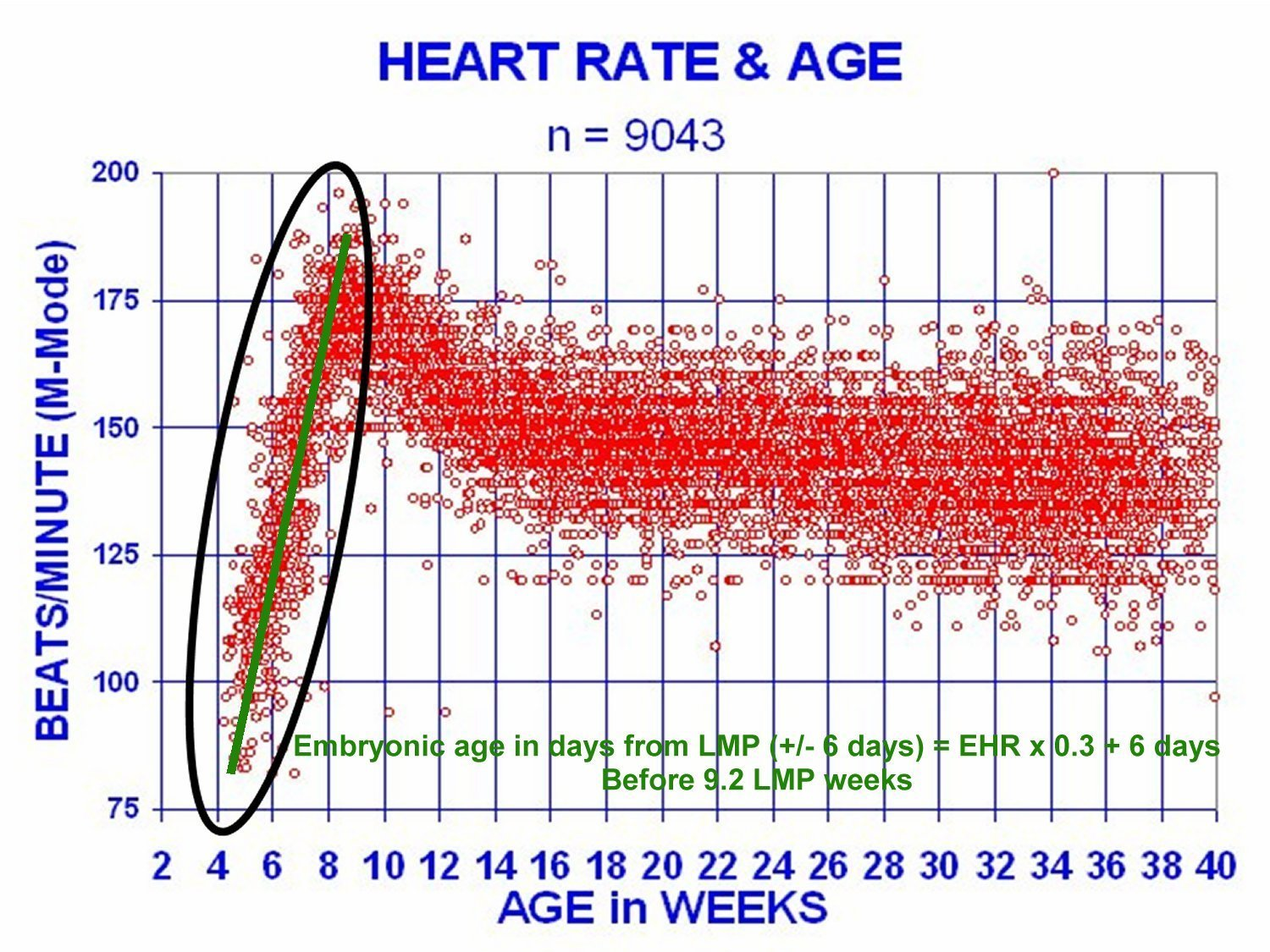
M-mode sonography measuring embryonic heart rate.

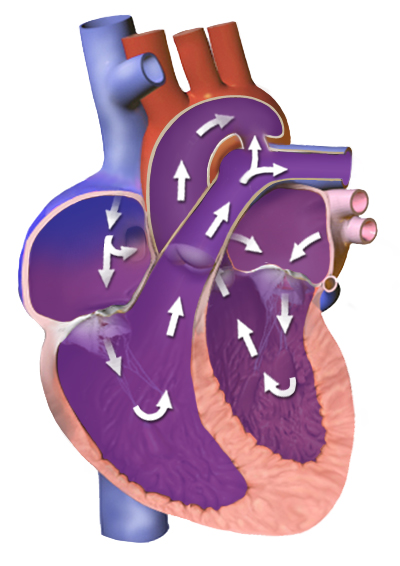
Blood flow in a neonate

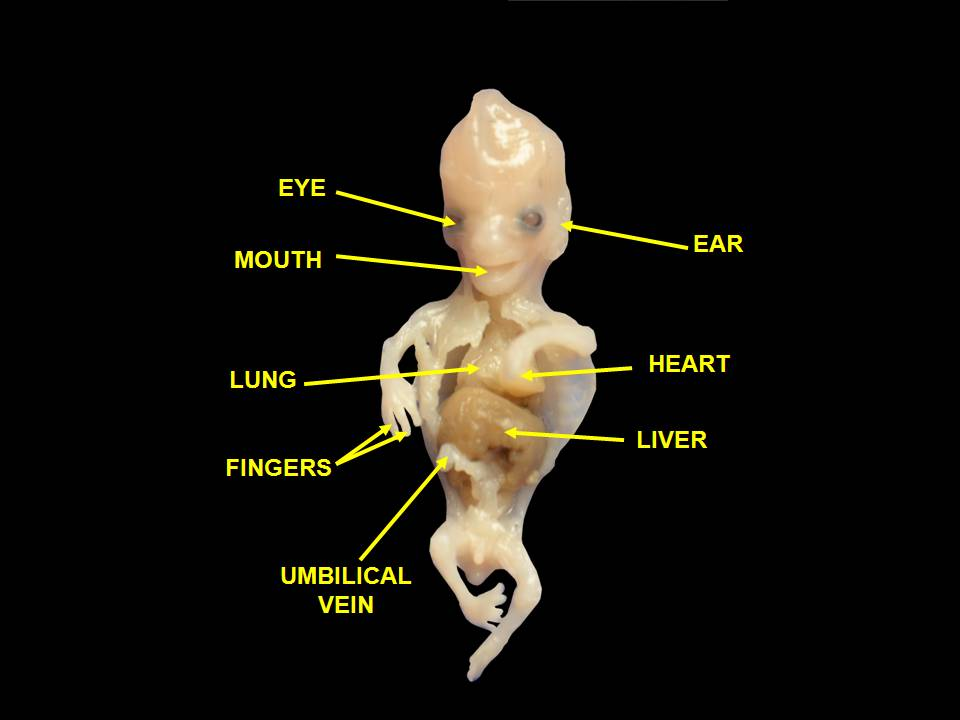
Human embryo, 38 mm, 8–9 weeks–anterior view, heart is visible.
