= Terminal sulcus (heart) =

Area of the heart

Details

Identifiers
- Latin: sulcus terminalis cordis
- TA98: A12.1.01.013
- TA2: 3946
- FMA: 9287

The terminal sulcus is a groove on the outer surface of the right atrium of the heart marking the transition between the sinus venarum cavarum (which has a distinct embryological origin) and the rest of the right atrium (which features pectinate muscles on its inner surface). The terminal sulcus corresponds to the position of the terminal crest on the inner surface of the right atrium. The terminal sulcus (and crest) indicate the position of the sinoatrial node.

== Anatomy ==
The terminal sulcus extends from the front of the superior vena cava to the front of the inferior vena cava, and represents the line of union of the sinus venosus of the embryo with the primitive atrium.

The superior border of the terminal sulcus designates the transverse plane in which the SA node resides. The inferior border designates the transverse plane in which the AV node resides.
