= Interatrial foramen =

Interatrial foramen may refer to:

- Primary interatrial foramen
- Foramen secundum
