= Primary interatrial foramen =

Heart developmental condition

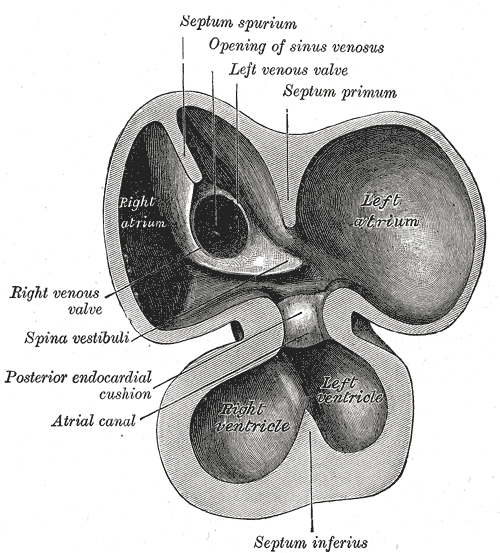
- The developing human heart, at day 30. The ostium primum joins the primitive atrium and lies beneath the septum primum (top middle) and becomes progressively smaller as the septum grows in size.

Details
- System: Cardiovascular system
- Location: Developing heart

Identifiers
- Latin: foramen primum
- TE: interatrial foramen_by_E5.11.1.5.2.1.1 E5.11.1.5.2.1.1

In the developing heart, the atria are initially open to each other, with the opening known as the primary interatrial foramen or ostium primum (or interatrial foramen primum). The foramen lies beneath the edge of septum primum and the endocardial cushions. It progressively decreases in size as the septum grows downwards, and disappears with the formation of the atrial septum.

== Structure ==
The foramen lies beneath the edge of septum primum and the endocardial cushions. It progressively decreases in size as the septum grows downwards, and disappears with the formation of the atrial septum.

== Closure ==
The septum primum, a septum which grows down to separate the primitive atrium into the left atrium and right atrium, grows in size over the course of heart development. The primary interatrial foramen is the gap between the septum primum and the septum intermedium, which gets progressively smaller until it closes.

== Clinical significance ==
Failure of the septum primum to fuse with the endocardial cushion can lead to an ostium primum atrial septal defect. This is the second most common type of atrial septal defect and is commonly seen in Down syndrome. Typically, this defect will cause a shunt to occur from the left atrium to the right atrium. Children born with this condition may be asymptomatic, however, over time pulmonary hypertension and the resulting hypertrophy of the right side of the heart will lead to a reversal of this shunt. This reversal is called Eisenmenger syndrome.
