= Terminal sulcus =

Terminal sulcus or Sulcus terminalis may refer to:

- Terminal sulcus (heart), a groove in the right atrium of the heart
- Terminal sulcus (tongue), a groove that separates the tongue into a superior oral surface and a posterior pharyngeal surface
