= Sinus venarum =

Section of the human heart

The sinus venarum (also known as the sinus of the vena cava, or sinus venarum cavarum) is the portion of the right atrium in the adult human heart where the inner surface of the right atrium is smooth, whereas the rest of the inner surface is rough (trabeculated) due to the presence of pectinate muscles. The sinus venarum represents the portion of the adult heart that develops from the right sinus horn of the foetal sinus venosus. The sinus venarum is demarcated from the rest of the right atrium by the crista terminalis (internally) and the sulcus terminalis (externally).
