= Crista terminalis =

Anatomical feature of the heart

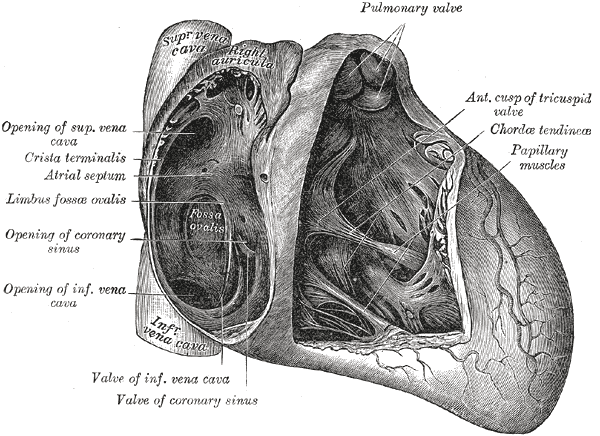
- Interior of the heart, frontal view (crista terminalis labeled on the left, second from the top)

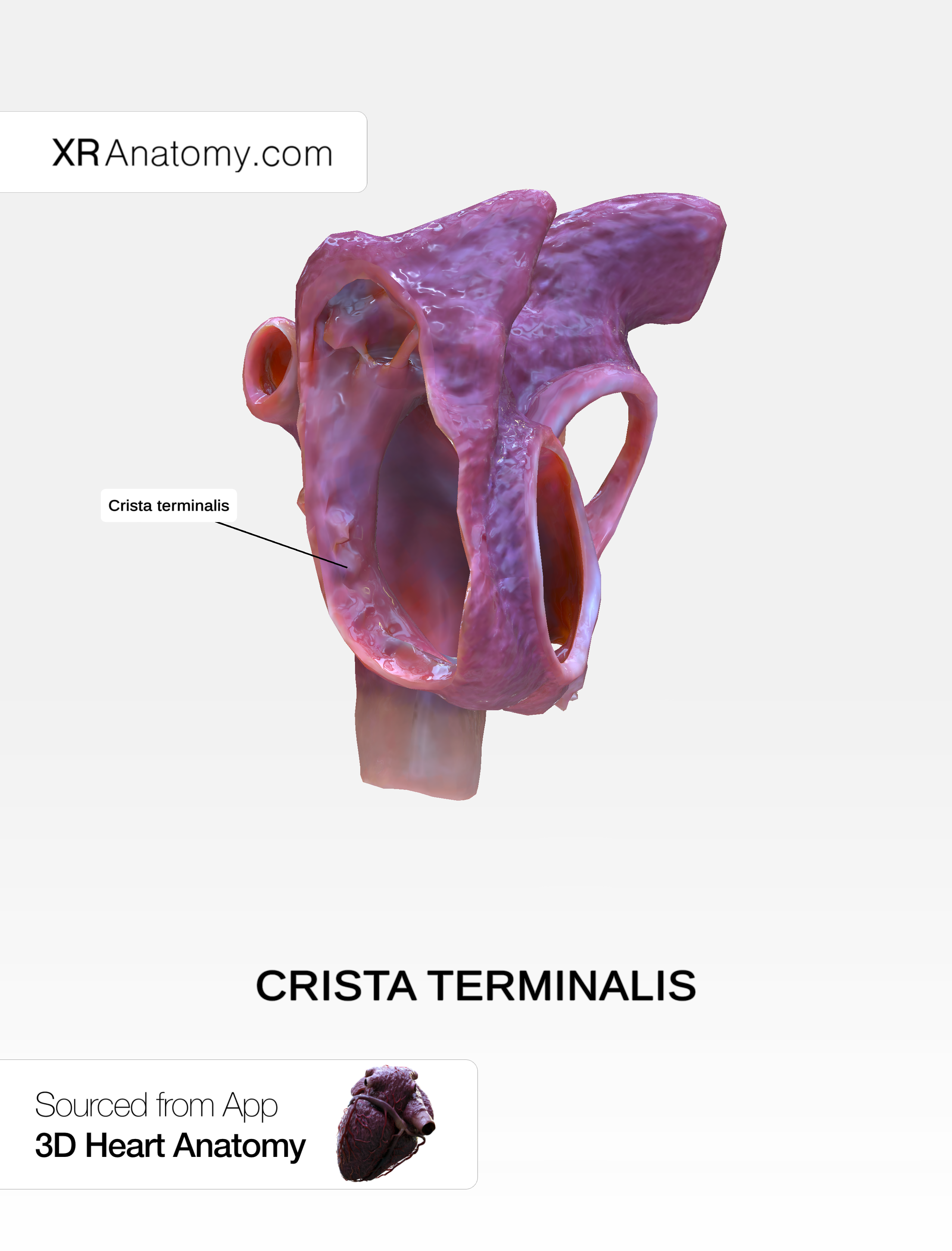

Details

Identifiers
- Latin: crista terminalis atrii dextri
- TA98: A12.1.01.003
- TA2: 4025
- FMA: 9236

The crista terminalis (also known as the terminal crest, or crista terminalis of His) is a vertical ridge on the posterolateral inner surface of the adult right atrium extending between the superior vena cava, and the inferior vena cava. The crista terminalis denotes where the junction of the embryologic sinus venosus and the right atrium occurred during embryonic development. It forms a boundary between the rough trabecular portion and the smooth, sinus venosus-derived portion (sinus venarum) of the internal surface of the right atrium. The sinoatrial node is located within the crista terminalis.

== Anatomy ==
The crista terminalis generally takes the form of a smooth-surfaced, crescent-shaped thickened portion of heart muscle at the opening into the right atrial appendage. It consists of fibromuscular tissue.

=== Features ===
On the external aspect of the right atrium, corresponding to the crista terminalis, is a groove - the terminal sulcus.

The crista terminalis provides the origin for the pectinate muscles.

The sinoatrial node is located in the superior part of the crista terminalis at the junction of the right atrium, and superior vena cava.

=== Development ===
During the development of the human heart, the right horn and transverse portion of the sinus venosus ultimately become incorporated with and form a part of the adult right atrium. The right sinus horn of the sinus venosus develops into the sinus venarum; in the adult right atrium, the portion of right atrium derived from the sinus venosus has a smooth inner surface.

== Clinical significance ==
A prominent crista terminalis may be mistaken for a cardiac mass during heart imaging; a prominent crista terminalis appears as a hyperechoic ridge on echocardiography, and homogenous to adjacent atrial wall on CT and MRI.

== See also ==
- Sinoatrial node
