= Septum spurium =

Heart structure seen in its development

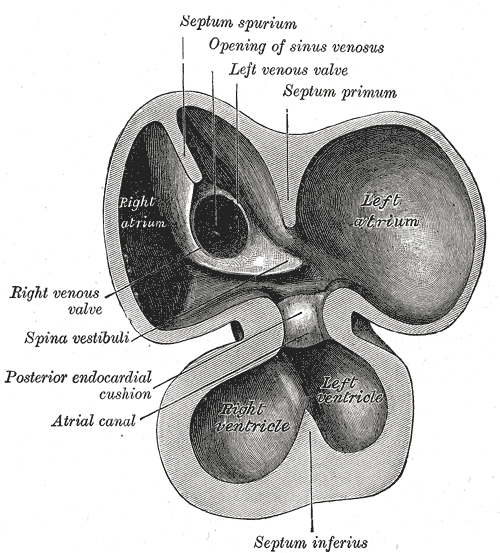
- Interior of dorsal half of heart from a human embryo of about thirty days. (Septum spurium labeled at upper left.)

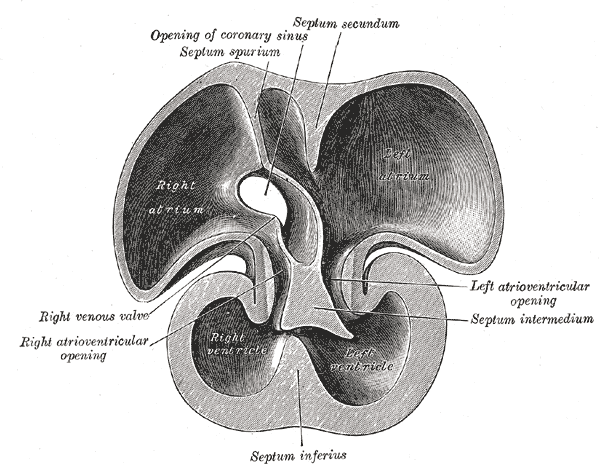
- Interior of dorsal half of heart of human embryo of about thirty-five days. (Septum spurium labeled at upper left.)

During development of the heart, the orifice of the sinus venosus lies obliquely, and is guarded by two valves, the right and left venous valves; above the opening these unite with each other and are continuous with a fold named the septum spurium.
