= Septum intermedium =

Heart structure seen in its development

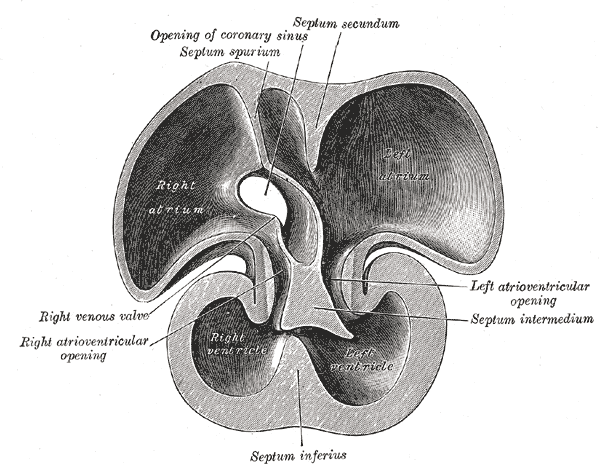
- Interior of dorsal half of heart of human embryo of about thirty-five days.

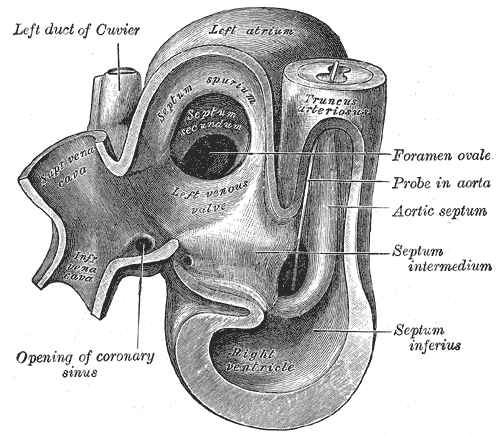
- Same heart as in Fig. 467, opened on right side.

Details
- Days: 35

Endocardial cushions project into the atrial canal, and, meeting in the middle line, unite to form the septum intermedium which divides the canal into two channels, the future right and left atrioventricular orifices.
