= Atrioventricular canal =

Structure in the heart

Details
- System: Fetal circulation
- Location: Developing heart

The proper development of the atrioventricular canal into its prospective components (the heart septum and associated valves) to create a clear division between the four compartments of the heart and ensure proper blood movement through the heart, are essential for proper heart function. When this process does not happen correctly, a child will develop atrioventricular canal defect which occurs in 2 out of every 10,000 births. It also has a correlation with Down syndrome because 20% of children with Down syndrome have atrioventricular canal disease as well. This is a very serious condition and surgery is necessary within the first six months of life for a child. Half of the children who are untreated with this condition die during their first year due to heart failure or pneumonia.

Atrioventricular canal defect is a combination of abnormalities of the heart and is present at birth. There is a problem when there are holes present in the walls that separate chambers (septa), as well as when valves are incorrectly constructed. There are other names for these heart abnormalities such as endocardial cushion defects or atrioventricular septal defect.

== Development ==
A photo of the basic anatomical structures of the heart. During normal heart development all four chambers are separated and the mitral and tricuspid valves are properly developed.

In a normal heart there are four chambers. These are the right and left atria, and right and left ventricles. The right atrium and right ventricle function to pump blood to the lungs while the left atrium and left ventricle pump blood to the rest of the body. There are heart valves in place that inhibit back-flow between these chambers.

== Clinical relevance ==
=== Atrioventricular canal defect ===
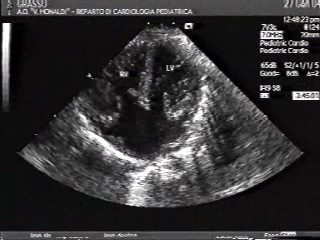
This is an echocardiography of a complete atrioventricular canal defect. There is a clear absence of the lower septum that would separate all four chambers of the heart.

An atrioventricular canal defect is developed because of the improper formation of the endocardial cushions, and their job is to separate the different parts of the heart during development when they fuse. It is strongly associated with Down's syndrome. The structures that develop from the fusion of the endocardial cushions are:

- The interatrial septum divides the left and right atrium
- The interventricular septum divides the left and right ventricles.
- The mitral valve and tricuspid valve are formed by the proper division of an early common valve being separated into two.

Atrioventricular canal defect may be divided into partial or complete forms. In the partial form, openings between the left and right atria and improper formation of the mitral valve exist. In the complete form, there is free movement in all chambers because there is a large hole where the atria and ventricles meet, and instead of there being two valves there is one common valve.

Surgery is usually conducted in-between the 3rd and 6th month of life, and with this condition the earlier the better. Usually, intracardiac repair involves closing the holes in the septum and the creation of two new atrioventricular valves from the underdeveloped common valve leaflet.

== See also ==
- Atrioventricular septal defect
- Atrioventricular septum
