= Septum primum =

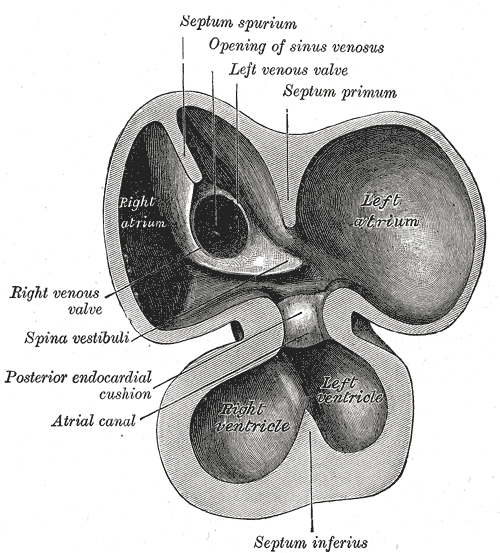
- The developing human heart, at day 30. The septum primum (top middle) grows down to separate the primitive atrium into the left and right atrium of the human heart.

Details
- Carnegie stage: 13
- Days: 29
- Gives rise to: atrial septum

Identifiers
- Latin: septum primum

During heart development of a human embryo, the single primitive atrium becomes divided into right and left by a septum, the septum primum. The septum primum (from Latin 'first septum') grows downward into the single atrium.

== Development ==
The gap below it is known as the ostium primum (from Latin 'first opening'), and becomes increasingly small. The septum primum eventually fuses with the endocardial cushion, closing the ostium primum off completely. Meanwhile, perforations appear in the superior part of the septum primum, forming the ostium secundum (from Latin 'second opening'). The septum primum will eventually form part of the fossa ovalis. Blood flow between atria will continue through the foramen ovale (heart).

== Clinical significance ==
Failure of the septum primum to fuse with the endocardial cushion can lead to an ostium primum atrial septal defect. This is the second most common type of atrial septal defect and is commonly seen in Down syndrome. Typically this defect will cause a shunt to occur from the left atrium to the right atrium. Children born with this defect may be asymptomatic, however, over time pulmonary hypertension and the resulting hypertrophy of the right side of the heart will lead to a reversal of this shunt. This reversal is called Eisenmenger's syndrome.
