= Pectinate muscles =

Muscular ridges found in the heart

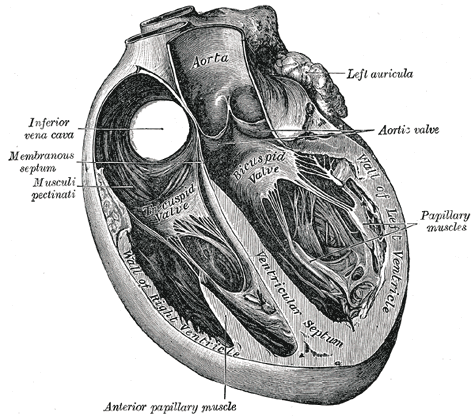
- Section of the heart showing the ventricular septum. (Pectinate muscles labeled at center left.)

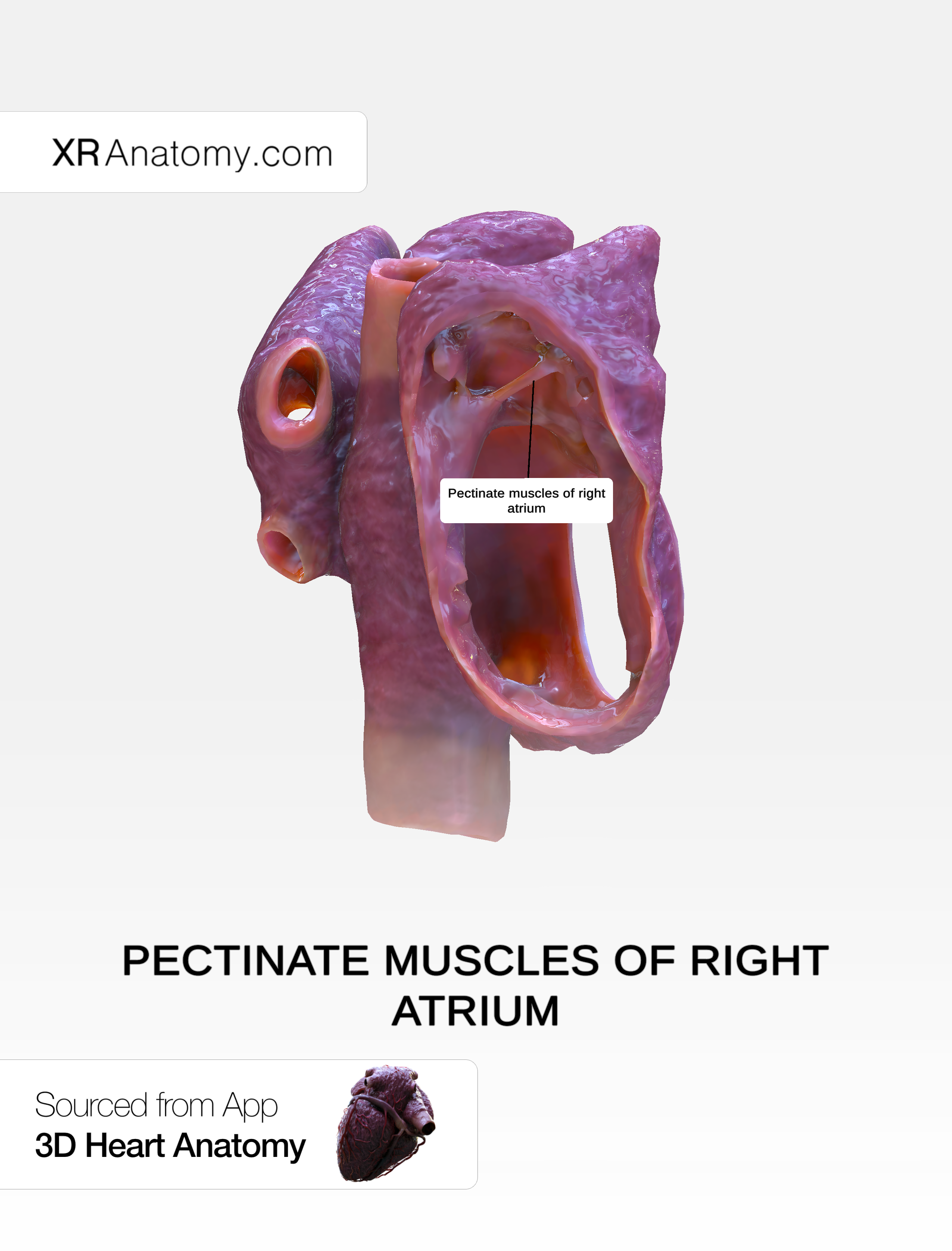

Details

Identifiers
- Latin: musculi pectinati atrii dextri, musculi pectinati atrii sinistri
- FMA: 12226

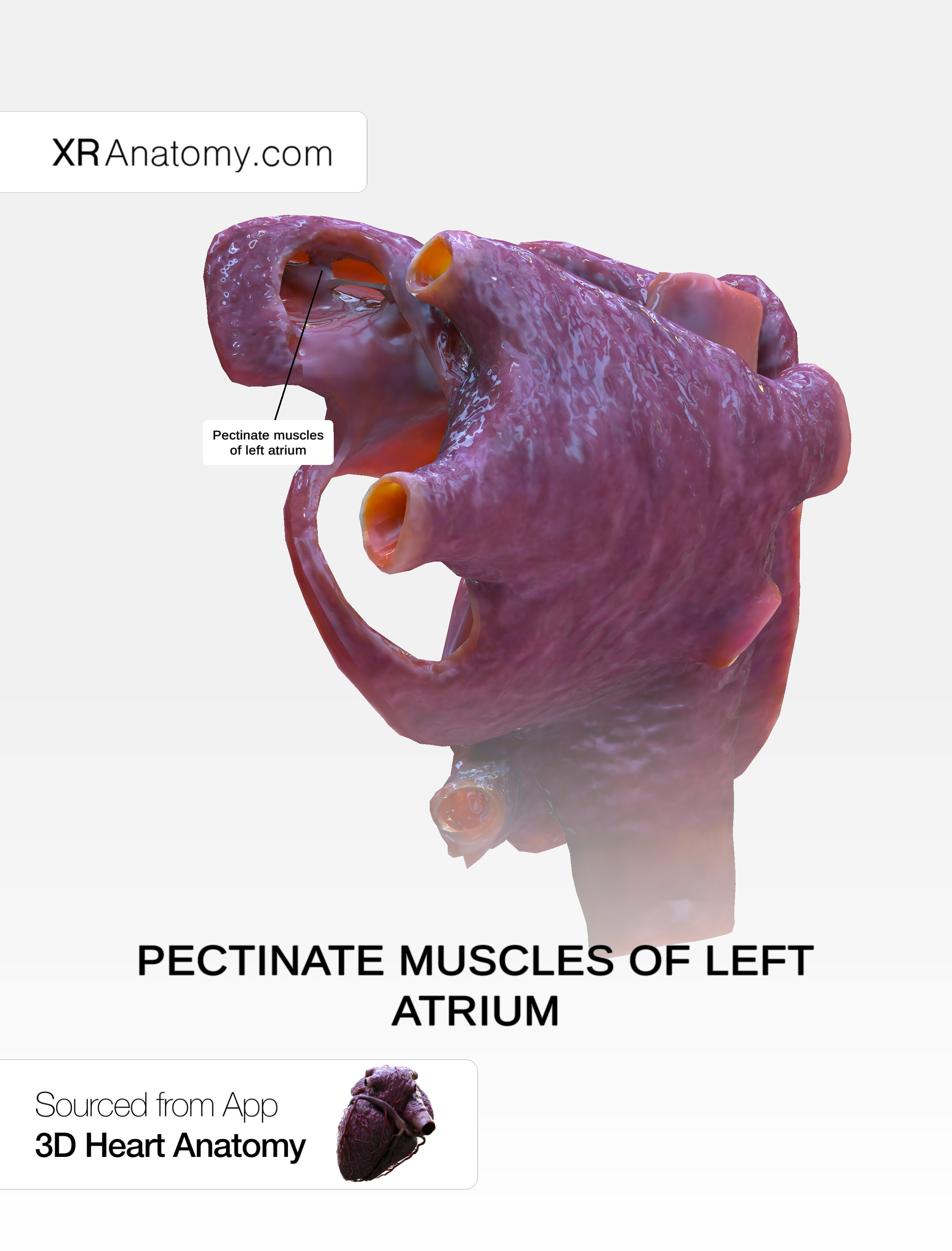

The pectinate muscles (musculi pectinati) are parallel muscular ridges in the walls of the atria of the heart.

== Structure ==
In the atria of the heart, there are two different types of walls. Behind the crest (crista terminalis) of the right atrium, also known as the posterior wall, the internal surface is smooth. This is called the sinus venarum. The pectinate muscles make up the part of the anterior wall, the wall in front of the sinus venarum, the right atrial appendage.

In the left atrium, the pectinate muscles are confined to the inner surface of its atrial appendage. They tend to be fewer and smaller than in the right atrium. This is due to the embryological origin of the auricles, which are the true atria. Some sources cite that the pectinate muscles are useful in increasing the power of contraction without increasing heart mass substantially.

Pectinate muscles of the atria are different from the trabeculae carneae, which are found on the inner walls of both ventricles. The pectinate muscles originate from the crista terminalis.

== Name ==
The pectinate muscles are so-called because of their resemblance to the teeth of a comb, as in pecten.
