= Sinus venosus =

Cavity in the hearts of chordates

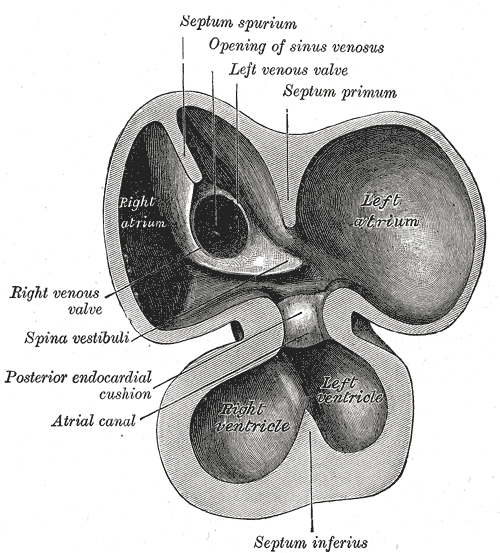
- Interior of dorsal half of heart from a human embryo of about thirty days, frontal view. (Opening of sinus venosus labeled at center top.)

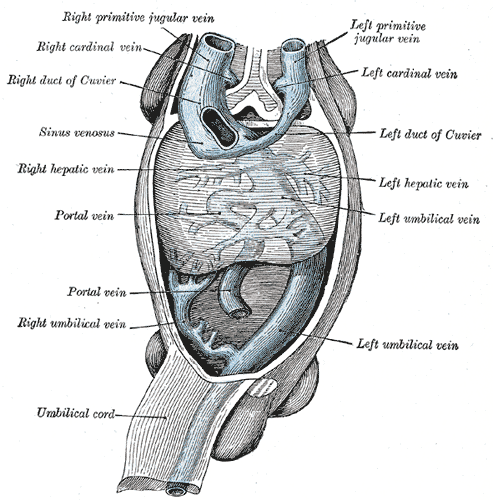
- Human embryo with heart and anterior body-wall removed to show the sinus venosus and its tributaries. (Sinus venosus labeled at center left.)

Details
- Carnegie stage: 9
- System: Cardiovascular system

Identifiers
- Latin: sinus venosus cordis
- TA98: A12.0.00.016
- TA2: 3911
- TE: venosus_by_E5.11.1.3.2.0.4, E5.11.1.5.1.0.1 E5.11.1.3.2.0.4, E5.11.1.5.1.0.1
- FMA: 70303

The sinus venosus is a large quadrangular cavity which precedes the atrium on the venous side of the chordate heart.

In mammals, the sinus venosus exists distinctly only in the embryonic heart where it is found between the two venae cavae; in the adult, the sinus venosus becomes incorporated into the wall of the right atrium to form a smooth part called the sinus venarum which is separated from the rest of the atrium by a ridge called the crista terminalis. In most mammals, the sinus venosus also forms the sinoatrial node and the coronary sinus.

== Development ==
In the embryo, the thin walls of the sinus venosus are connected below with the right ventricle, and medially with the left atrium, but are free in the rest of their extent. It receives blood from the vitelline vein, umbilical vein and common cardinal vein.

The sinus venosus originally starts as a paired structure but shifts towards associating only with the right atrium as the embryonic heart develops. The left portion shrinks in size and eventually forms the coronary sinus (right atrium) and oblique vein of the left atrium, whereas the right part becomes incorporated into the right atrium to form the sinus venarum.

== Additional images ==
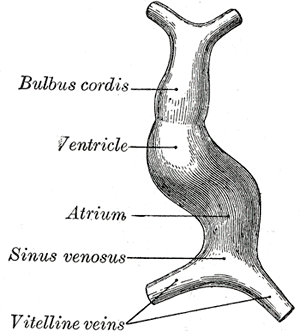
Diagram to illustrate the simple tubular condition of the heart.

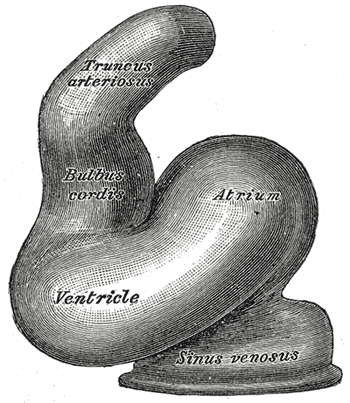
Heart of human embryo of about fourteen days.

Scheme of arrangement of parietal veins.

== See also ==
- Atrial septal defect
- Bulbus cordis
- Ducts of Cuvier
- Primitive ventricle
- Primitive atrium
- Ductus venosus
- Truncus arteriosus
- Sinus venosus atrial septal defect
