= Endocardial tubes =

Precursor stage of the heart in embryos

The endocardial tubes are paired regions in the embryo that appear in its ventral pole by the middle of the third week of gestation and consist of precursor cells for the development of the embryonic heart. The endocardial heart tubes derive from the visceral mesoderm and initially are formed by a confluence of angioblastic blood vessels on either side of the embryonic midline. The endocardial tubes have an intimate proximity to the foregut or pharyngeal endoderm.

As folding of the embryo in the horizontal plane initiates in the 4th week of gestation, the endocardial tubes meet in the midline to form the primitive heart tube, which will eventually develop into the histologically definitive endocardium. The myocardium forms from mesoderm cells surrounding the heart tube, while the epicardium develops from other cells, most likely from neural crest cells.
