= Primitive atrium =

Stage in heart development

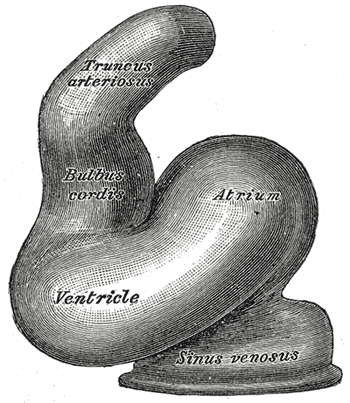
- Heart of human embryo of about fourteen days.

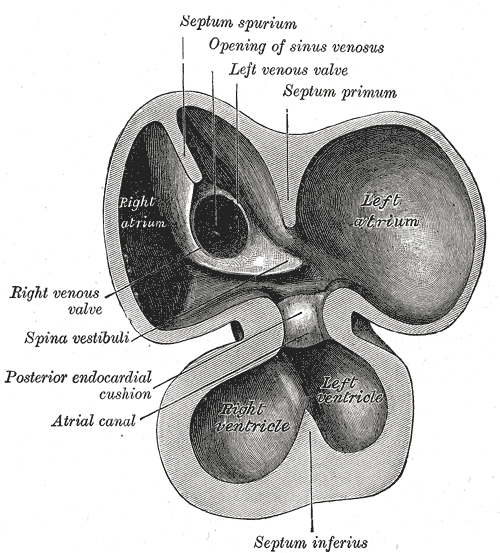
- Interior of dorsal half of heart from a human embryo of about thirty days.

Details
- Gives rise to: right atrium, left atrium

Identifiers
- Latin: atrium primitivum

The primitive atrium is a stage in the embryonic development of the human heart. It grows rapidly and partially encircles the bulbus cordis; the groove against which the bulbus cordis lies is the first indication of a division into right and left atria.

The cavity of the primitive atrium becomes subdivided into right and left chambers by a septum, the septum primum, which grows downward into the cavity.

For a time the atria communicate with each other by an opening, the primary interatrial foramen, below the free margin of the septum.

This opening is closed by the union of the septum primum with the septum intermedium, and the communication between the atria is re-established through an opening which is developed in the upper part of the septum primum; this opening is known as the foramen ovale (ostium secundum of Born) and persists until birth.

A second septum, the septum secundum, semilunar in shape, grows downward from the upper wall of the atrium immediately to the right of the primary septum and foramen ovale.

Shortly after birth it fuses with the primary septum, and by this means the foramen ovale is closed, but sometimes the fusion is incomplete and the upper part of the foramen remains patent. The limbus fossæ ovalis denotes the free margin of the septum secundum.

Issuing from each lung is a pair of pulmonary veins; each pair unites to form a single vessel, and these in turn join in a common trunk which opens into the left atrium.

Subsequently, the common trunk and the two vessels forming it expand and form the vestibule or greater part of the atrium, the expansion reaching as far as the openings of the four vessels, so that in the adult all four veins open separately into the left atrium.
