= Foramen ovale (heart) =

Passageway between the atria of the human heart

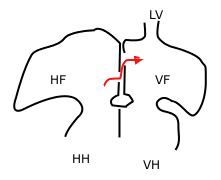
- Sketch showing foramen ovale in a fetal heart. Red arrow shows blood from the inferior cava traveling to the right atrium and then to the left atrium. HF: right atrium, VF: left atrium. HH and VH: right and left ventricle. The heart still has a common pulmonary vein (LV), instead of four.

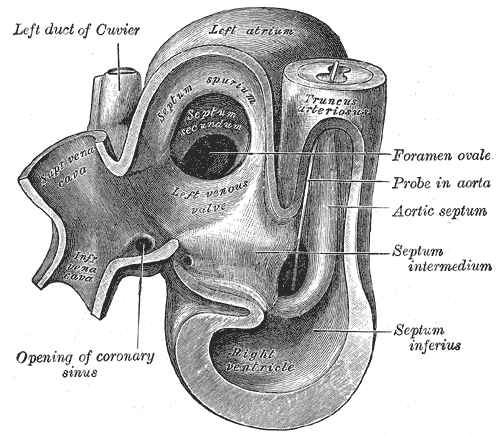
- Heart of human embryo of about thirty-five days, opened on left side.

Details
- Precursor: Septum secundum
- System: Cardiovascular system

Identifiers
- MeSH: D054085
- TA98: A12.1.01.007
- TA2: 3967
- FMA: 86043

In the fetal heart, the foramen ovale (/fəˈreɪmən oʊˈvæli, -mɛn-, -ˈvɑː-, -ˈveɪ-/), also foramen Botalli or the ostium secundum of Born, allows blood to enter the left atrium from the right atrium. It is one of two fetal cardiac shunts, the other being the ductus arteriosus (which allows blood that reaches to the right ventricle to bypass the pulmonary circulation). Another similar adaptation in the fetus is the ductus venosus. In most individuals, the foramen ovale closes at birth. It later forms the fossa ovalis.

== Development ==
The foramen ovale (from Latin 'oval hole') forms in the late fourth week of gestation, as a small passageway between the septum secundum and the ostium secundum. Initially the atria are separated from one another by the septum primum except for a small opening below the septum, the ostium primum. As the septum primum grows, the ostium primum narrows and eventually closes. Before it does so, bloodflow from the inferior vena cava wears down a portion of the septum primum, forming the ostium secundum. Some embryologists postulate that the ostium secundum may be formed through programmed cell death.

The ostium secundum provides communication between the atria after the ostium primum closes completely. Subsequently, a second wall of tissue, the septum secundum, grows over the ostium secundum in the right atrium. Blood then passes from the right to left atrium only by way of a small passageway in the septum secundum and then through the ostium secundum. This passageway is called the foramen ovale.

=== Closure ===
The foramen ovale often closes at birth. At birth, when the lungs become functional, the pulmonary vascular pressure decreases and the left atrial pressure exceeds that of the right. This forces the septum primum against the septum secundum, functionally closing the foramen ovale. In time the septa eventually fuse, leaving a remnant of the foramen ovale, the fossa ovalis.

== Function ==
A fetus receives oxygen not from its lungs, but from the mother's oxygen-rich blood via the placenta. Oxygenated blood from the placenta travels through the umbilical cord to the right atrium of the fetal heart. As the fetal lungs are non-functional at this time, the blood bypasses them through two cardiac shunts. The first is the foramen ovale (the valve present between them called eustachian valve) which shunts blood from the right atrium to the left atrium. The second is the ductus arteriosus which shunts blood from the pulmonary artery (which, after birth, carries blood from the right side of the heart to the lungs) to the descending aorta.

== Clinical significance ==
In about 25% of adults the foramen ovale does not close completely, but remains as a small patent foramen ovale ("PFO"). In most of these individuals, the PFO causes no problems and remains undetected throughout life.

PFO has long been studied because of its role in paradoxical embolism (an embolism that travels from the venous side to the arterial side). This may lead to a stroke or transient ischemic attack. Transesophageal echocardiography is considered the most accurate investigation to demonstrate a patent foramen ovale. A patent foramen ovale may also be an incidental finding.

== See also ==
- Coronary arteries
