= Endocardial cushions =

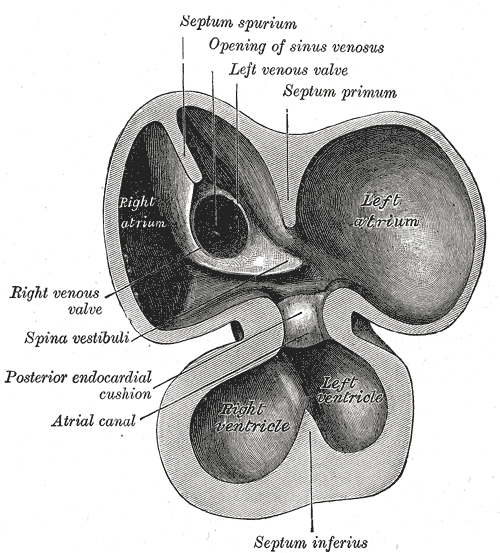
- Interior of dorsal half of heart from a human embryo of about thirty days.

Details
- Carnegie stage: 14
- Days: 27
- Precursor: Lateral plate mesoderm
- Gives rise to: Septum intermedium

Identifiers
- Latin: tubera endocardiaca atrioventricularia
- MeSH: D054089
- TE: cushions_by_E5.11.1.6.0.0.4 E5.11.1.6.0.0.4

Endocardial cushions, or atrioventricular cushions, refer to a subset of cells in the development of the heart that play a vital role in the proper formation of the heart septa.

They develop on the atrioventricular canal and conotruncal region of the bulbus cordis.

During heart development, the heart starts out as a tube. As heart development continues, this tube undergoes remodeling to eventually form the four-chambered heart. The endocardial cushions are a subset of cells found in the developing heart tube that will give rise to the heart's primitive valves and septa, critical to the proper formation of a four-chambered heart.

== Development ==
The endocardial cushions are thought to arise from a subset of endothelial cells that undergo epithelial-mesenchymal transition, a process whereby these cells break cell-to-cell contacts and migrate into the cardiac jelly (towards the interior of the heart tube). These migrated cells form the "swellings" called the endocardial cushions seen in the heart tube.

Upon sectioning of the heart the atrioventricular endocardial cushions can be observed in the lumen of the atrial canal as two thickenings, one on its dorsal and another on its ventral wall. These thickenings will go on to fuse and remodel to eventually form the valves and septa of the mature adult heart.

== Clinical significance ==
A problem in endocardial cushion development or remodeling is thought to be associated with atrioventricular septal defect.

== See also ==
- Endocardial tubes
- Heart development
- Mesenchyme
