= Atrium (heart) =

Part of the human heart

- Front view of heart showing the atria

Details
- Part of: Heart
- System: Circulatory system

Identifiers
- Latin: atrium
- MeSH: D006325
- TA98: A12.1.00.017
- FMA: 7099

The atrium (Latin: ātrium, lit. 'entry hall'; pl.: atria) is one of the two upper chambers in the heart that receives blood from the circulatory system. The blood in the atria is pumped into the heart ventricles through the atrioventricular mitral and tricuspid heart valves.

There are two atria in the human heart – the left atrium receives blood from the pulmonary circulation, and the right atrium receives blood from the venae cavae of the systemic circulation. During the cardiac cycle, the atria receive blood while relaxed in diastole, then contract in systole to move blood to the ventricles. Each atrium is roughly cube-shaped except for an ear-shaped projection called an atrial appendage, previously known as an auricle. All animals with a closed circulatory system have at least one atrium.

The atrium was formerly called the 'auricle'. That term is still used to describe this chamber in some other animals, such as the Mollusca. Auricles in this modern terminology are distinguished by having thicker muscular walls.

== Structure ==
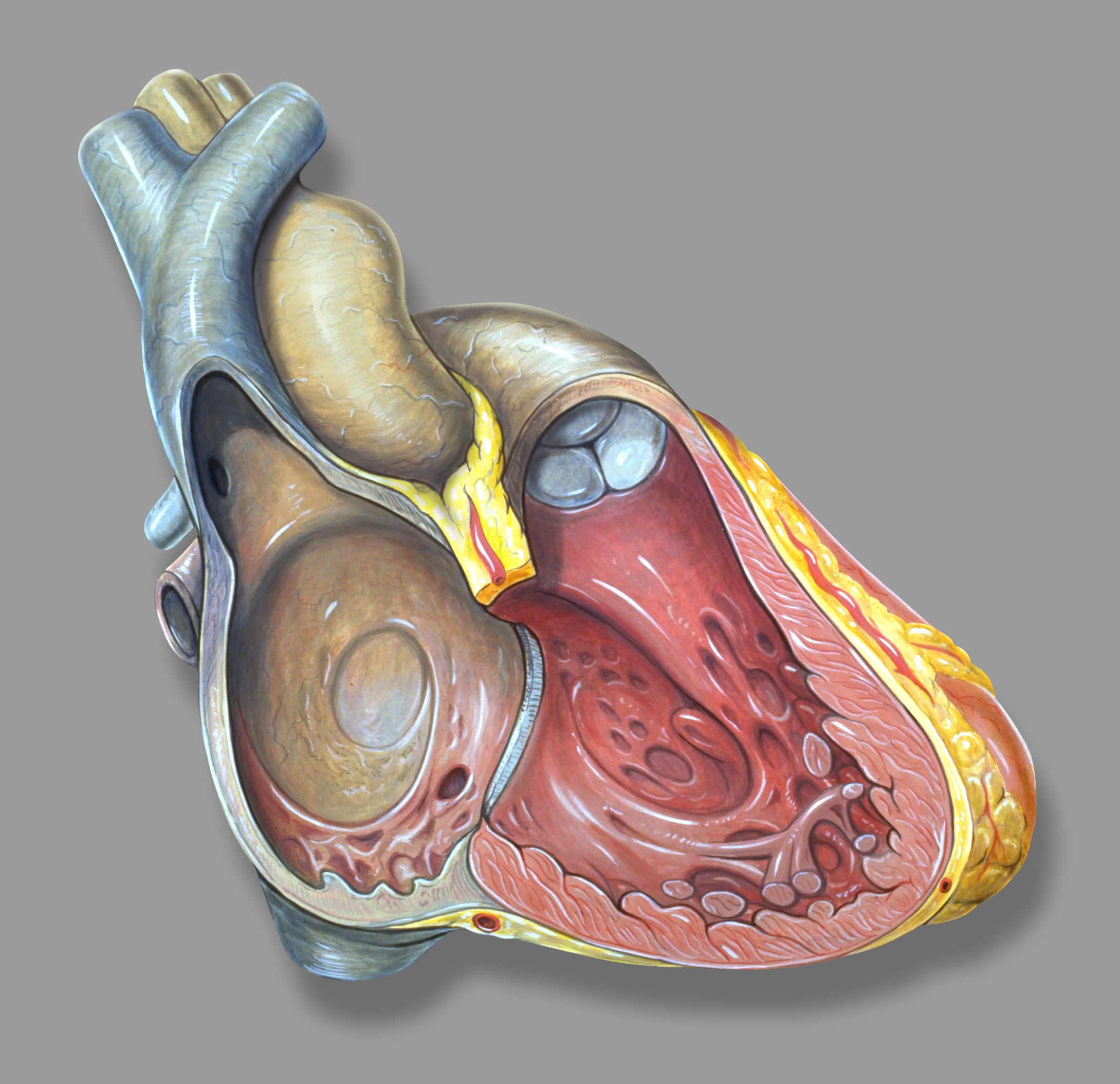
Right heart anatomy, right ventricle seen on right of illustration

Humans have a four-chambered heart consisting of the right and left atrium, and the right and left ventricle. The atria are the two upper chambers which pump blood to the two lower ventricles.

The right atrium and ventricle are often referred to together as the right heart, and the left atrium and ventricle as the left heart. As the atria do not have valves at their inlets, a venous pulsation is normal, and can be detected in the jugular vein as the jugular venous pressure. Internally, there are the rough pectinate muscles, and the crista terminalis of His, which act as a boundary inside the atrium and the smooth-walled part of the right atrium, the sinus venarum, which are derived from the sinus venosus. The sinus venarum is the adult remnant of the sinus venosus and it surrounds the openings of the venae cavae and the coronary sinus. Attached to each atrium is an atrial appendage.

=== Right atrium ===
The right atrium receives and holds deoxygenated blood from the superior vena cava, inferior vena cava, anterior cardiac veins, smallest cardiac veins and the coronary sinus, which it then sends down to the right ventricle through the tricuspid valve, which in turn sends it to the pulmonary artery for pulmonary circulation.

==== Right atrial appendage ====
The right atrial appendage (also known as right auricle, lat: auricula atrii dextra) is located at the front upper surface of the right atrium. Looking from the front, the right atrial appendage appears wedge-shaped or triangular. Its base surrounds the superior vena cava. The right atrial appendage is a pouch-like extension of the right atrium and is covered by a trabecula network of pectinate muscles. The interatrial septum separates the right atrium from the left atrium; this is marked by a depression in the right atrium – the fossa ovalis. The atria are depolarised by calcium.

=== Left atrium ===
The left atrium receives the oxygenated blood from the left and right pulmonary veins, which it pumps to the left ventricle (through the mitral valve (left atrioventricular valve) for pumping out through the aorta for systemic circulation.

==== Left atrial appendage ====
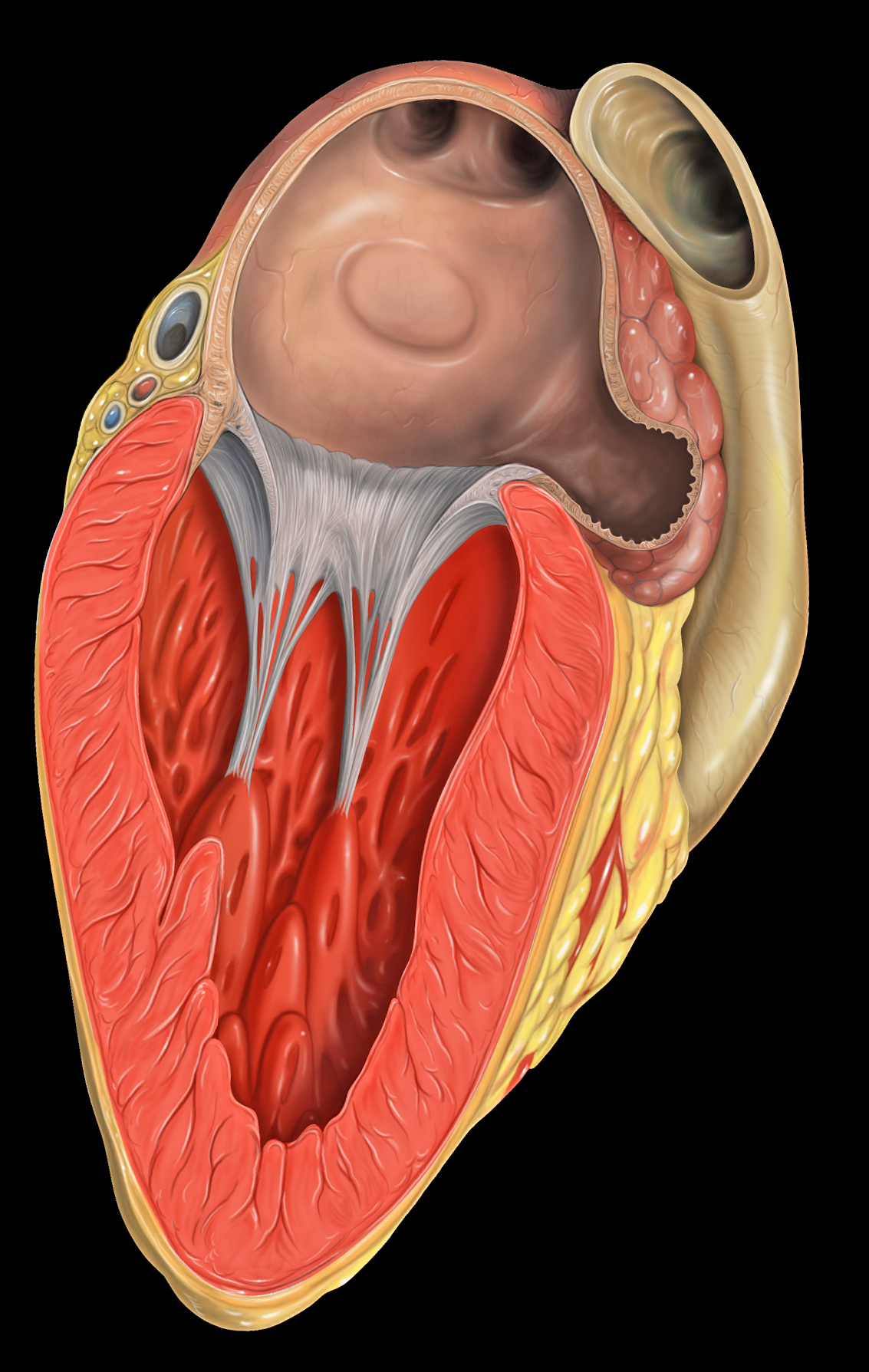
Left atrial appendage shown at upper right

High in the upper part of the left atrium is a muscular ear-shaped pouch – the left atrial appendage (LAA) (also known as left auricle, lat: auricula atrii sinistra), which has a tubular trabeculated structure. LAA anatomy as seen in a CT scan is characterized as being in one of four groups: chicken wing (48%), cactus (30%), windsock (19%), and cauliflower(3%). Cauliflower is the morphology most often associated with embolism. The LAA appears to "function as a decompression chamber during left ventricular systole and during other periods when left atrial pressure is high". It also modulates intravascular volume by secreting natriuretic peptides, namely atrial natriuretic peptide (ANP), and brain natriuretic peptide (BNP) into the coronary sinus, where they enter into the blood circulation.

The left atrial appendage can be seen on a standard posteroanterior X-ray, where the lower level of the left hilum becomes concave. It can also be seen clearly using transesophageal echocardiography. The left atrial appendage can serve as an approach for mitral valve surgery. The body of the left atrial appendage is anterior to the left atrium and parallel to the left pulmonary veins. The left pulmonary artery passes posterosuperiorly and is separated from the atrial appendage by the transverse sinus. In atrial fibrillation, the left atrial appendage fibrillates rather than contracts resulting in blood stasis that predisposes to the formation of blood clots. Because of consequent stroke risk, surgeons may choose to close it during open-heart surgery, using a left atrial appendage occlusion procedure.

=== Conduction system ===
The sinoatrial node (SA node) is located in the posterior aspect of the right atrium, next to the superior vena cava. This is a group of pacemaker cells which spontaneously depolarize to create an action potential. The cardiac action potential then spreads across both atria causing them to contract, forcing the blood they hold into their corresponding ventricles.

The atrioventricular node (AV node) is another node in the cardiac conduction system. This is located between the atria and the ventricles.

=== Blood supply ===
The left atrium is supplied mainly by the left circumflex coronary artery, and its small branches.

The oblique vein of the left atrium is partly responsible for venous drainage; it derives from the embryonic left superior vena cava.

=== Development ===
During embryogenesis at about two weeks, a primitive atrium begins to be formed as one chamber, which over the following two weeks becomes divided by the septum primum into the left atrium and the right atrium. The interatrial septum has an opening in the right atrium, the foramen ovale, which provides access to the left atrium; this connects the two chambers, which is essential for fetal blood circulation. At birth, when the first breath is taken fetal blood flow is reversed to travel through the lungs. The foramen ovale is no longer needed and it closes to leave a depression (the fossa ovalis) in the atrial wall.

In some cases, the foramen ovale fails to close. This abnormality is present in approximately 25% of the general population. This is known as a patent foramen ovale, an atrial septal defect. It is mostly unproblematic, although it can be associated with paradoxical embolization and stroke.

Within the fetal right atrium, blood from the inferior vena cava and the superior vena cava flow in separate streams to different locations in the heart; this has been reported to occur through the Coandă effect.

== Function ==
In human physiology, the atria facilitate circulation primarily by allowing uninterrupted venous flow to the heart during ventricular systole. By being partially empty and distensible, atria prevent the interruption of venous flow to the heart that would occur during ventricular systole if the veins ended at the inlet valves of the heart. In normal physiologic states, the output of the heart is pulsatile, and the venous inflow to the heart is continuous and non-pulsatile. But without functioning atria, venous flow becomes pulsatile, and the overall circulation rate decreases significantly.

Atria have four essential characteristics that cause them to promote continuous venous flow. (1) There are no atrial inlet valves to interrupt blood flow during atrial systole. (2) The atrial systole contractions are incomplete and thus do not contract to the extent that would block flow from the veins through the atria into the ventricles. During atrial systole, blood not only empties from the atria to the ventricles, but blood continues to flow uninterrupted from the veins right through the atria into the ventricles. (3) The atrial contractions must be gentle enough so that the force of contraction does not exert significant back pressure that would impede venous flow. (4) The "let go" of the atria must be timed so that they relax before the start of ventricular contraction, to be able to accept venous flow without interruption.

By preventing the inertia of interrupted venous flow that would otherwise occur at each ventricular systole, atria allow approximately 75% more cardiac output than would otherwise occur. The fact that atrial contraction is 15% of the amount of the succeeding ventricular ejection has led to a misplaced emphasis on their role in pumping up the ventricles (the so-called "atrial kick"), whereas the key benefit of atria is in preventing circulatory inertia and allowing uninterrupted venous flow to the heart.

Also of importance in maintaining the blood flow are the presence of atrial volume receptors. These are low-pressure baroreceptors in the atria, which send signals to the hypothalamus when a drop in atrial pressure (which indicates a drop in blood volume) is detected. This triggers a release of vasopressin.

== Disorders ==
=== Atrial septal defect ===
In an adult, an atrial septal defect results in the flow of blood in the reverse direction – from the left atrium to the right – which reduces cardiac output, potentially causing cardiac failure, and in severe or untreated cases cardiac arrest and sudden death.

=== Left atrial appendage thrombosis ===
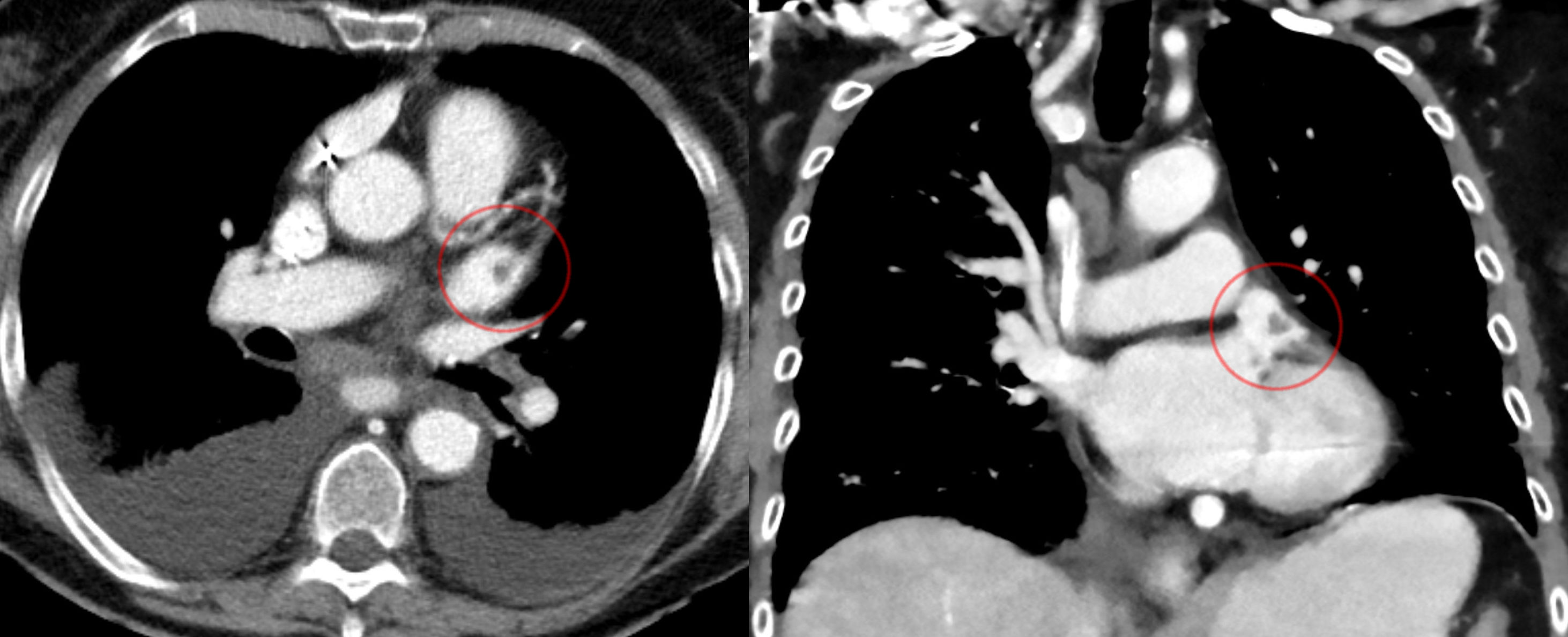
CT scan of the chest showing a thrombus in the left atrial appendage (left: axial plane, right: coronal plane)

In patients with atrial fibrillation, mitral valve disease, and other conditions, blood clots have a tendency to form in the left atrial appendage. The clots may dislodge (forming emboli), which may lead to ischemic damage to the brain, kidneys, or other organs supplied by the systemic circulation.

In those with uncontrollable atrial fibrillation, left atrial appendage occlusion may be performed at the time of any open-heart surgery to prevent future clot formation within the appendage.

=== Chiari network ===
A chiari network; named after and described by Hans Chiari; is a malformation of the right ventricle. Formed due to malabsorption of the right sided sinus venosus valve, which normally forms the sinus venarum, this causes a web-like structure to appear. Outside of rare circumstances, this is usually non-clinically significant outside of potentially causing misdiagnosis as it resembles other cardiac deformities and can cause difficulty during certain cardiac surgeries.

=== Functional abnormalities ===
- Wolff–Parkinson–White syndrome
- Atrial fibrillation
- Atrial flutter
- Atrial tachycardia
- Sinus tachycardia
- Multifocal atrial tachycardia – several types
- Premature atrial contraction

== Other animals ==
Many other animals, including mammals, also have four-chambered hearts, which have a similar function. Some animals (amphibians and reptiles) have a three-chambered heart, in which the blood from each atrium is mixed in the single ventricle before being pumped to the aorta. In these animals, the left atrium still serves the purpose of collecting blood from the pulmonary veins.

In most fish, the circulatory system is very simple: a two-chambered heart including one atrium and one ventricle. Among sharks, the heart consists of four parts arranged serially: blood flows into the most posterior part, the sinus venosus, and then to the atrium which moves it to the third part, the ventricle, before it reaches the conus anteriosus, which itself is connected to the ventral aorta. This is considered a primitive arrangement, and many vertebrates have condensed the atrium with the sinus venosus and the ventricle with the conus anteriosus.

With the advent of lungs came a partitioning of the atrium into two parts divided by a septum. Among frogs, the oxygenated and deoxygenated blood is mixed in the ventricle before being pumped out to the body's organs; in turtles, the ventricle is almost entirely divided by a septum, but retains an opening through which some mixing of blood occurs. In birds, mammals, and some other reptiles (alligators in particular) the partitioning of both chambers is complete.

== See also ==
- Atrial syncytium
- Left atrial volume
