= Altitude sickness =

Medical condition due to rapid exposure to low oxygen at high altitude

- Other names: High-altitude sickness, altitude illness, hypobaropathy, altitude bends, soroche
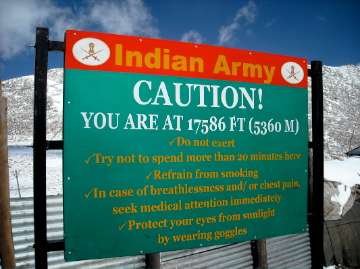
- Altitude sickness warning – Indian Army
- Specialty: Emergency medicine
- Symptoms: Headache, vomiting, feeling tired, trouble sleeping, dizziness
- Complications: High-altitude pulmonary edema (HAPE), high-altitude cerebral edema (HACE)
- Usual onset: Within 24 hours
- Types: Acute mountain sickness, high-altitude pulmonary edema, high-altitude cerebral edema, chronic mountain sickness
- Causes: Low amounts of oxygen at high elevation
- Risk factors: Prior episode, high degree of activity, rapid increase in elevation
- Diagnostic method: Based on symptoms
- Differential diagnosis: Exhaustion, viral infection, hangover, dehydration, carbon monoxide poisoning
- Prevention: Gradual ascent
- Treatment: Descent to lower altitude, sufficient fluids
- Medication: Ibuprofen, acetazolamide, dexamethasone, oxygen therapy
- Frequency: 20% at 2,500 metres (8,000 ft); 40% at 3,000 metres (10,000 ft)

Altitude sickness, the mildest form being acute mountain sickness (AMS), is a harmful effect of high altitude, caused by rapid exposure to low amounts of oxygen at high elevation. People's bodies can respond to high altitude in different ways. Symptoms of altitude sickness may include headaches, vomiting, tiredness, confusion, trouble sleeping, and dizziness. Acute mountain sickness can progress to high-altitude pulmonary edema (HAPE) with associated shortness of breath or high-altitude cerebral edema (HACE) with associated confusion. Chronic mountain sickness may occur after long-term exposure to high altitude.

Altitude sickness typically occurs only above 2,500 metres (8,000 ft), though some people are affected at lower altitudes. Risk factors include a prior episode of altitude sickness, a high degree of activity, and a rapid increase in elevation. Being physically fit does not decrease the risk. Diagnosis is based on symptoms and is supported for those who have more than a minor reduction in activities. It is recommended that at high altitude any symptoms of headache, nausea, shortness of breath, or vomiting be assumed to be altitude sickness.

Sickness is prevented by gradually increasing elevation by no more than 300 metres (1,000 ft) per day. Generally, descent and sufficient fluid intake can treat symptoms. Mild cases may be helped by ibuprofen, acetazolamide, or dexamethasone. Severe cases may benefit from oxygen therapy and a portable hyperbaric bag may be used if descent is not possible. The only definite and reliable treatment for severe AMS, HACE, and HAPE is to descend immediately until symptoms resolve. Other treatment efforts have not been well studied.

AMS occurs in about 20% of people after rapidly going to 2,500 metres (8,000 ft) and in 40% of people after going to 3,000 metres (10,000 ft). While AMS and HACE occurs equally frequently in males and females, HAPE occurs more often in males. The earliest description of altitude sickness is attributed to a Chinese text from around 30 BCE that describes "Big Headache Mountains", possibly referring to the Karakoram Mountains around Kilik Pass.

== Signs and symptoms ==
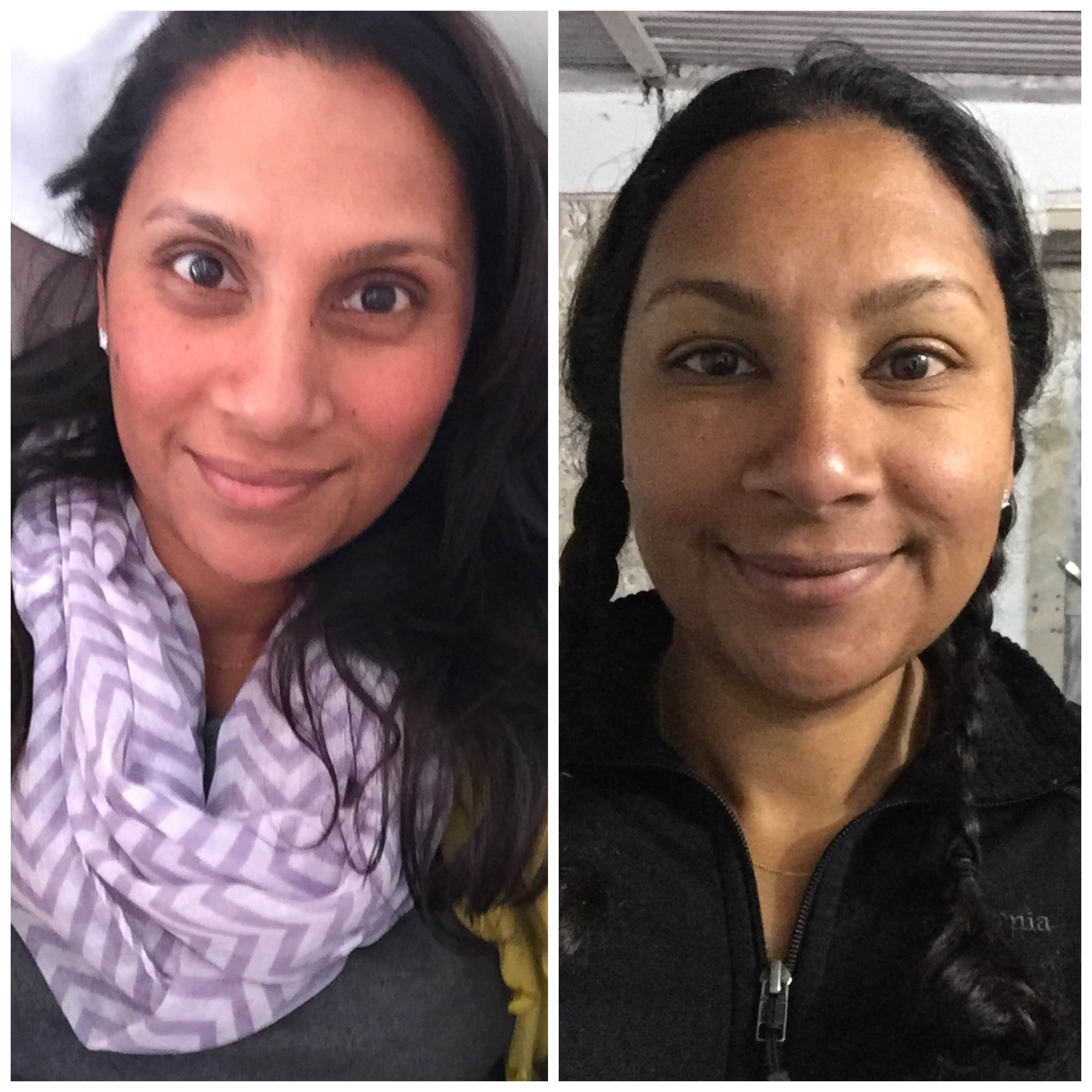
Left: A woman at normal altitude. Right: The same woman with a swollen face while trekking at high altitude (Annapurna Base Camp, Nepal; 4,130 m (13,550 ft)).

People have different susceptibilities to altitude sickness; for some otherwise healthy people, acute altitude sickness can begin to appear at around 2,000 metres (6,600 ft) above sea level, such as at many mountain ski resorts, equivalent to a pressure of 80 kilopascals (0.79 atm). This is the most frequent type of altitude sickness encountered. Symptoms often manifest within ten hours of ascent and generally subside within two days, though they occasionally develop into the more serious conditions. Symptoms include headache, confusion, fatigue, stomach illness, dizziness, and sleep disturbance. Exertion may aggravate the symptoms.

Those individuals with the lowest initial partial pressure of end-tidal pCO_{2} (the lowest concentration of carbon dioxide at the end of the respiratory cycle, a measure of a higher alveolar ventilation) and corresponding high oxygen saturation levels tend to have a lower incidence of acute mountain sickness than those with high end-tidal pCO_{2} and low oxygen saturation levels.

=== Primary symptoms ===
Headaches are the primary symptom used to diagnose altitude sickness, although a headache is also a symptom of dehydration. A headache occurring at an altitude above 2,400 metres (7,900 ft) – a pressure of 76 kilopascals (0.75 atm) – combined with any one or more of the following symptoms, may indicate altitude sickness:

Disordered system	Symptoms
Gastrointestinal	Loss of appetite, nausea, vomiting, excessive flatulation
Nervous	Fatigue or weakness, headache with or without dizziness or lightheadedness, insomnia, "pins and needles" sensation
Locomotory	Peripheral edema (swelling of hands, feet, and face)
Respiratory	Nose bleeding, shortness of breath upon exertion
Cardiovascular	Persistent rapid pulse
Other	General malaise

=== Severe symptoms ===
Symptoms that may indicate life-threatening altitude sickness include:

Pulmonary edema (fluid in the lungs)
Symptoms similar to bronchitis
Persistent dry cough
Fever
Shortness of breath even when resting

Cerebral edema (swelling of the brain)
Headache that does not respond to analgesics
Unsteady gait
Gradual loss of consciousness
Increased nausea and vomiting
Retinal hemorrhage

The most serious symptoms of altitude sickness arise from edema (fluid accumulation in the tissues of the body). At very high altitude, humans can get either high-altitude pulmonary edema (HAPE), or high-altitude cerebral edema (HACE). The physiological cause of altitude-induced edema is not conclusively established. It is currently believed, however, that HACE is caused by local vasodilation of cerebral blood vessels in response to hypoxia, resulting in greater blood flow and, consequently, greater capillary pressures. On the other hand, HAPE may be due to general vasoconstriction in the pulmonary circulation (normally a response to regional ventilation-perfusion mismatches) which, with constant or increased cardiac output, also leads to increases in capillary pressures. For those with HACE, dexamethasone may provide temporary relief from symptoms in order to keep descending under their own power.

HAPE can progress rapidly and is often fatal. Symptoms include fatigue, severe dyspnea at rest, and cough that is initially dry but may progress to produce pink, frothy sputum. Descent to lower altitudes alleviates the symptoms of HAPE.

HACE is a life-threatening condition that can lead to coma or death. Symptoms include headache, fatigue, visual impairment, bladder dysfunction, bowel dysfunction, loss of coordination, paralysis on one side of the body, and confusion. Descent to lower altitudes may save those affected by HACE.

== Cause ==
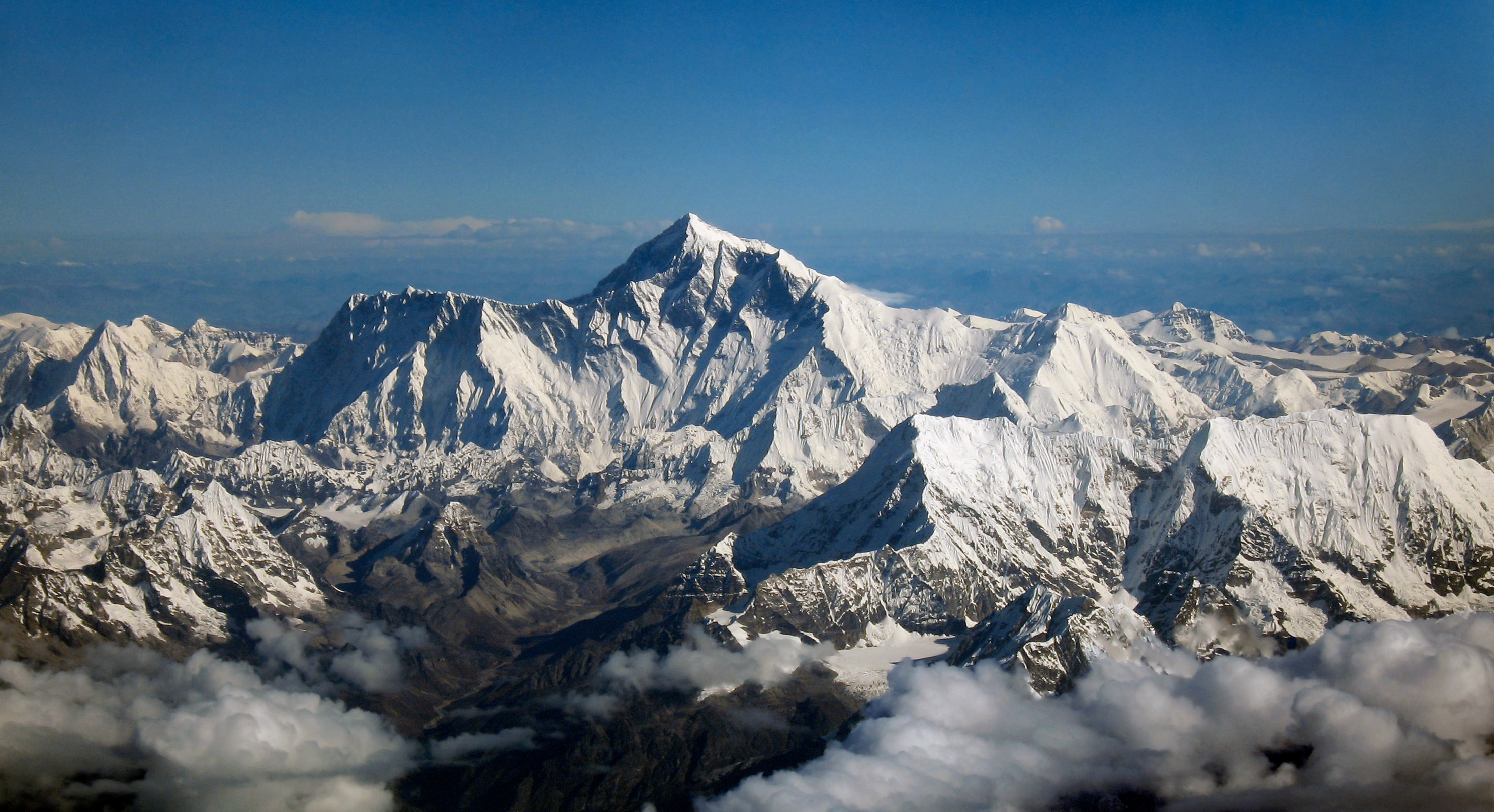
Climbers on Mount Everest often experience altitude sickness.

Altitude sickness can first occur at 1,500 metres (4,900 ft), with the effects becoming severe at extreme altitudes (greater than 5,500 metres (18,000 ft)). Only brief trips above 6,000 metres (20,000 ft) are possible and supplemental oxygen is needed to avert sickness.

As altitude increases, the available amount of oxygen to sustain mental and physical alertness decreases with the overall air pressure, though the relative percentage of oxygen in air, at about 21%, remains practically unchanged up to 21,350 metres (70,050 ft). The RMS velocities of diatomic nitrogen and oxygen are very similar and thus no change occurs in the ratio of oxygen to nitrogen until stratospheric heights.

Dehydration due to the higher rate of water vapor lost from the lungs at higher altitudes may contribute to the symptoms of altitude sickness.

The rate of ascent, altitude attained, amount of physical activity at high altitude, as well as individual susceptibility, are contributing factors to the onset and severity of high-altitude illness.

Altitude sickness usually occurs following a rapid ascent and can usually be prevented by ascending slowly. In most of these cases, the symptoms are temporary and usually abate as altitude acclimatization occurs. However, in extreme cases, altitude sickness can be fatal.

High altitude illness can be classified according to the altitude: high (1,500–3,500 metres (4,900–11,500 ft)), very high (3,500–5,500 metres (11,500–18,000 ft)) and extreme (above 5,500 metres (18,000 ft)).

=== High altitude ===
At high altitude, 1,500 to 3,500 metres (4,900 to 11,500 ft), the onset of physiological effects of diminished inspiratory oxygen pressure (PiO_{2}) includes decreased exercise performance and increased ventilation (lower arterial partial pressure of carbon dioxide: PCO_{2}). While arterial oxygen transport may be only slightly impaired the arterial oxygen saturation (SaO_{2}) generally stays above 90%. Altitude sickness is common between 2,400 and 4,000 metres (7,900 and 13,100 ft) because of the large number of people who ascend rapidly to these altitudes.

=== Very high altitude ===
At very high altitude, 3,500 to 5,500 metres (11,500 to 18,000 ft), maximum SaO_{2} falls below 90% as the arterial PO_{2} falls below 60mmHg. Extreme hypoxemia may occur during exercise, during sleep, and in the presence of high altitude pulmonary edema or other acute lung conditions. Severe altitude illness occurs most commonly in this range.

=== Extreme altitude ===
Above 5,500 metres (18,000 ft), marked hypoxemia, hypocapnia, and alkalosis are characteristic of extreme altitudes. Progressive deterioration of physiologic function eventually outstrips acclimatization. As a result, no permanent human habitation occurs above 5,100 metres (16,700 ft). A period of acclimatization is necessary when ascending to extreme altitude; abrupt ascent without supplemental oxygen for other than brief exposures invites severe altitude sickness.

== Mechanism ==
The physiology of altitude sickness centres around the alveolar gas equation; the atmospheric pressure is low, but there is still 20.9% oxygen. Water vapour still occupies the same pressure too—this means that there is less oxygen pressure available in the lungs and blood. Compare these two equations comparing the amount of oxygen in blood at altitude:

Type	At Sea Level	At 8400 m (The Balcony of Everest)	Formula
Pressure of oxygen in the alveolus	$21\% \times(101.3\text{ kPa}-6.3\text{ kPa}) - \left (\frac{5.3\text{ kPa}}{0.8} \right ) = 13.3 \text{ kPa O}_2$	$21\% \times(36.3\text{ kPa}-6.3\text{ kPa}) - \left (\frac{1.8\text{ kPa}}{0.74} \right ) = 3.9 \text{ kPa O}_2$	$F_I \text{O}_2 \times(P_\text{B}-P_{\text{H}_2\text{O}}) - \left (\frac{P_{\text{CO}_2}}{\text{RQ}} \right )$
Oxygen carriage in the blood	$\left(0.98 \times 1.34 \times 14\frac{\text{g}}{\text{dL}}\right) + (0.023\times 12\text{ kPa}) = \frac{17.3 \text{ mL O}_2}{100 \text{ mL blood}}$	$\left(0.54 \times 1.34 \times 19.3\frac{\text{g}}{\text{dL}}\right) + (0.023\times 3.3\text{ kPa}) = \frac{14.0 \text{ mL O}_2}{100 \text{ mL blood}}$	$(\text{Sa}_{\text{O}_2}\times 1.34\tfrac{\text{mL}}{\text{g Hb}} \times \text{Hb}) + (\text{O}_2\text{ carriage in blood} \times \text{Pa}_{\text{O}_2})$

The hypoxia leads to an increase in minute ventilation (hence both low CO_{2}, and subsequently bicarbonate), Hb increases through haemoconcentration and erythrogenesis. Alkalosis shifts the haemoglobin dissociation constant to the left, 2,3-BPG increases to counter this. Cardiac output increases through an increase in heart rate.

The body's response to high altitude includes the following:

- ↑ Erythropoietin → ↑ hematocrit and haemoglobin
- ↑ 2,3-BPG (allows ↑ release of O_{2} and a right shift on the Hb-O_{2} disassociation curve)
- ↑ kidney excretion of bicarbonate (use of acetazolamide can augment for treatment)
- Chronic hypoxic pulmonary vasoconstriction (can cause right ventricular hypertrophy)

People with high-altitude sickness generally have reduced hyperventilator response, impaired gas exchange, fluid retention or increased sympathetic drive. There is thought to be an increase in cerebral venous volume because of an increase in cerebral blood flow and hypocapnic cerebral vasoconstriction causing oedema.

== Diagnosis ==
Altitude sickness is typically self-diagnosed since symptoms are consistent: nausea, vomiting, headache, and can generally be deduced from a rapid change in altitude or oxygen levels. However, some symptoms may be confused with dehydration. Some severe cases may require professional diagnosis which can be assisted with multiple different methods such as using an MRI or CT scan to check for abnormal buildup of fluids in the lung or brain.

== Prevention ==
Ascending slowly is the best way to avoid altitude sickness. Avoiding strenuous activity such as skiing, hiking, etc. in the first 24 hours at high altitude may reduce the symptoms of AMS. Alcohol and sleeping pills are respiratory depressants, and thus slow down the acclimatization process and should be avoided. Alcohol also tends to cause dehydration and exacerbates AMS. Thus, avoiding alcohol consumption in the first 24–48 hours at a higher altitude is optimal.

=== Pre-acclimatization ===
Pre-acclimatization is when the body develops tolerance to low oxygen concentrations before ascending to an altitude. It significantly reduces risk because less time has to be spent at altitude to acclimatize in the traditional way. Additionally, because less time has to be spent on the mountain, less food and supplies have to be taken up. Several commercial systems exist that use altitude tents, so called because they mimic altitude by reducing the percentage of oxygen in the air while keeping air pressure constant to the surroundings. Examples of pre-acclimation measures include remote ischaemic preconditioning, using hypobaric air breathing in order to simulate altitude, and positive end-expiratory pressure.

=== Altitude acclimatization ===
Altitude acclimatization is the process of adjusting to decreasing oxygen levels at higher elevations, in order to avoid altitude sickness. Once above approximately 3,000 metres (10,000 ft) – a pressure of 70 kilopascals (0.69 atm) – most climbers and high-altitude trekkers take the "climb-high, sleep-low" approach. For high-altitude climbers, a typical acclimatization regimen might be to stay a few days at a base camp, climb up to a higher camp (slowly), and then return to base camp. A subsequent climb to the higher camp then includes an overnight stay. This process is then repeated a few times, each time extending the time spent at higher altitudes to let the body adjust to the oxygen level there, a process that involves the production of additional red blood cells. Once the climber has acclimatized to a given altitude, the process is repeated with camps placed at progressively higher elevations. The rule of thumb is to ascend no more than 300 m (1,000 ft) per day to sleep. That is, one can climb from 3,000 m (9,800 ft) (70 kPa or 0.69 atm) to 4,500 m (15,000 ft) (58 kPa or 0.57 atm) in one day, but one should then descend back to 3,300 m (10,800 ft) (67.5 kPa or 0.666 atm) to sleep. This process cannot safely be rushed, and this is why climbers need to spend days (or even weeks at times) acclimatizing before attempting to climb a high peak. Simulated altitude equipment such as altitude tents provide hypoxic (reduced oxygen) air, and are designed to allow partial pre-acclimation to high altitude, reducing the total time required on the mountain itself.

Altitude acclimatization is necessary for some people who move rapidly from lower altitudes to higher altitudes.

=== Medications ===
The drug acetazolamide (trade name Diamox) may help some people making a rapid ascent to sleeping altitude above 2,700 metres (9,000 ft), and it may also be effective if started early in the course of AMS. Acetazolamide can be taken before symptoms appear as a preventive measure at a dose of 125 mg twice daily. The Everest Base Camp Medical Centre cautions against its routine use as a substitute for a reasonable ascent schedule, except where rapid ascent is forced by flying into high altitude locations or due to terrain considerations. The Centre suggests a dosage of 125 mg twice daily for prophylaxis, starting from 24 hours before ascending until a few days at the highest altitude or on descending; with 250 mg twice daily recommended for treatment of AMS. The Centers for Disease Control and Prevention (CDC) suggest the same dose for prevention of 125 mg acetazolamide every 12 hours. Acetazolamide, a mild diuretic, works by stimulating the kidneys to secrete more bicarbonate in the urine, thereby acidifying the blood. This change in pH stimulates the respiratory center to increase the depth and frequency of respiration, thus speeding the natural acclimatization process. An undesirable side-effect of acetazolamide is a reduction in aerobic endurance performance. Other minor side effects include a tingle-sensation in hands and feet. Although a sulfonamide, acetazolamide is a non-antibiotic and has not been shown to cause life-threatening allergic cross-reactivity in those with a self-reported sulfonamide allergy. Dosage of 1000 mg/day will produce a 25% decrease in performance, on top of the reduction due to high-altitude exposure. The CDC advises that Dexamethasone be reserved for treatment of severe AMS and HACE during descents, and notes that Nifedipine may prevent HAPE.

There is insufficient evidence to determine the safety of sumatriptan and if it may help prevent altitude sickness. Despite their popularity, antioxidant treatments have not been found to be effective medications for prevention of AMS. Interest in phosphodiesterase inhibitors such as sildenafil has been limited by the possibility that these drugs might worsen the headache of mountain sickness. A promising possible preventive for altitude sickness is myo-inositol trispyrophosphate (ITPP), which increases the amount of oxygen released by hemoglobin.

Prior to the onset of altitude sickness, ibuprofen is a suggested non-steroidal anti-inflammatory and painkiller that can help alleviate both the headache and nausea associated with AMS. It has not been studied for the prevention of cerebral edema (swelling of the brain) associated with extreme symptoms of AMS.

=== Over-the-counter herbal supplements and traditional medicines ===
Herbal supplements and traditional medicines are sometimes suggested to prevent high altitude sickness including ginkgo biloba, R crenulata, minerals such as iron, antacids, and hormonal-based supplements such as medroxyprogesterone and erythropoietin. Medical evidence to support the effectiveness and safety of these approaches is often contradictory or lacking. Indigenous peoples of the Americas, such as the Aymaras of the Altiplano, have for centuries chewed coca leaves to try to alleviate the symptoms of mild altitude sickness. This therapy has not been proven effective in a clinical study. In Chinese and Tibetan traditional medicine, an extract of the root tissue of Radix rhodiola is often taken in order to prevent the symptoms of high altitude sickness, however, no clear medical studies have confirmed the effectiveness or safety of this extract.

=== Oxygen enrichment ===
In high-altitude conditions, oxygen enrichment can counteract the hypoxia related effects of altitude sickness. A small amount of supplemental oxygen reduces the equivalent altitude in climate-controlled rooms. At 3,400 metres (11,200 ft) (67 kPa or 0.66 atm), raising the oxygen concentration level by 5% via an oxygen concentrator and an existing ventilation system provides an effective altitude of 3,000 m (10,000 ft) (70 kPa or 0.69 atm), which is more tolerable for those unaccustomed to high altitudes.

Oxygen from gas bottles or liquid containers can be applied directly via a nasal cannula or mask. Oxygen concentrators based upon pressure swing adsorption (PSA), VSA, or vacuum-pressure swing adsorption (VPSA) can be used to generate the oxygen if electricity is available. Stationary oxygen concentrators typically use PSA technology, which has performance degradations at the lower barometric pressures at high altitudes. One way to compensate for the performance degradation is to use a concentrator with more flow capacity. There are also portable oxygen concentrators that can be used on vehicular DC power or on internal batteries, and at least one system commercially available measures and compensates for the altitude effect on its performance up to 4,000 m (13,000 ft). The application of high-purity oxygen from one of these methods increases the partial pressure of oxygen by raising the FiO_{2} (fraction of inspired oxygen).

=== Other methods ===
Increased water intake may also help in acclimatization to replace the fluids lost through heavier breathing in the thin, dry air found at altitude, although consuming excessive quantities ("over-hydration") has no benefits and may cause dangerous hyponatremia.

== Treatment ==
The only definite and reliable treatment for severe AMS, HACE, and HAPE is to descend immediately until symptoms resolve.

Attempts to treat or stabilize the patient in situ (at altitude) are dangerous unless highly controlled and with good medical facilities. However, the following treatments have been used when the patient's location and circumstances permit:

- Oxygen may be used for mild to moderate AMS below 3,700 metres (12,000 ft) and is commonly provided by physicians at mountain resorts. Symptoms abate in 12 to 36 hours without the need to descend.
- For more serious cases of AMS, or where rapid descent is impractical, a Gamow bag, a portable plastic hyperbaric chamber inflated with a foot pump, can be used to reduce the effective altitude by as much as 1,500 m (5,000 ft). A Gamow bag is generally used only as an aid to evacuate severe AMS patients, not to treat them at altitude.
- Acetazolamide 250 mg twice daily dosing assists in AMS treatment by quickening altitude acclimatization. A study by the Denali Medical Research Project concluded: "In established cases of acute mountain sickness, treatment with acetazolamide relieves symptoms, improves arterial oxygenation, and prevents further impairment of pulmonary gas exchange."
- The folk remedy for altitude sickness in Ecuador, Peru and Bolivia is a tea made from the coca plant. See mate de coca.
- Steroids can be used to treat the symptoms of pulmonary or cerebral edema, but do not treat the underlying AMS.
- Two studies in 2012 showed that ibuprofen 600 milligrams three times daily was effective at decreasing the severity and incidence of AMS; it was not clear if HAPE or HACE was affected.
- Paracetamol (acetaminophen) has also shown to be as good as ibuprofen for altitude sickness when tested on climbers ascending Everest.

== Epidemiology ==
José de Acosta, SJ (1539 or 1540 in Medina del Campo, Spain – February 15, 1600 in Salamanca, Spain) was a sixteenth-century Spanish Jesuit missionary and naturalist in Latin America. His deductions regarding the ill effects of crossing over the Andes in 1570 related to the atmosphere being too thin for human needs led to the modern understanding of a variety of altitude sickness, now referred to as Acosta's disease.

Tourists and mountain climbers are two groups of people who typically contract altitude sickness. Risk levels depend on age, gender, normal level of exercise, physical health, home elevation, genetics, and speed of ascension. Individuals with anemia, substance abuse disorders, and medical problems involving the lungs, heart, or nervous system are at greater risk of developing altitude sickness.

=== Mining ===
Location of major active mines in Chile in elevations more than 2000 m above closest city.

Elevation sickness is a common workplace illness in mining operations in the Chilean Andes where workers dwelling in the lowlands have to perform work at the mines and associated facilities several thousand meters higher up. Chilean law demands for compatibility tests for employees performing work at altitude and prescribes those workers already working at altitude and deemed unfit for such work to be redeployed to lower elevations while retaining the prior salary. A 2017 study found that contrary to Chile, both the United States and Peru lacked legislation regarding altitude sickness in mining operations.

Little is known about the effects of the intermittent exposure to high elevation that is common among workers in Chilean mines high up in the Andes.

== See also ==
- Altitude training – Athletic training at high elevations
- Cabin pressurization – Process to maintain internal air pressure in aircraft or spacecraft
- Effects of high altitude on humans – Environmental effects on physiology and mental health
- Mountaineering – Activity involving ascending mountains
- Secondary polycythemia – Laboratory diagnosis of high hemoglobin content in blood
- Hypoxic ventilatory response – Biological reaction to increased altitude
- Decompression sickness – Disorder caused by dissolved gases forming bubbles in tissues
