= Altitude =

Height in relation to a specified reference point

Altitude is a vertical measurement between a reference datum and an object.

Altitude is a distance measurement, usually in the vertical or "up" direction, between a reference datum and a point or object. The exact definition and reference datum varies according to the context (e.g., aviation, geometry, geographical survey, sport, or atmospheric pressure). Although the term altitude is commonly used to mean the height above sea level of a location, in geography the term elevation is often preferred for this usage.

In aviation, altitude is typically measured relative to mean sea level or above ground level to ensure safe navigation and flight operations. In geometry and geographical surveys, altitude helps create accurate topographic maps and understand the terrain's elevation. For high-altitude trekking and sports, knowing and adapting to altitude is vital for performance and safety. Higher altitudes mean reduced oxygen levels, which can lead to altitude sickness if proper acclimatization measures are not taken.

Vertical distance measurements in the "down" direction are commonly referred to as depth.

== Aviation ==
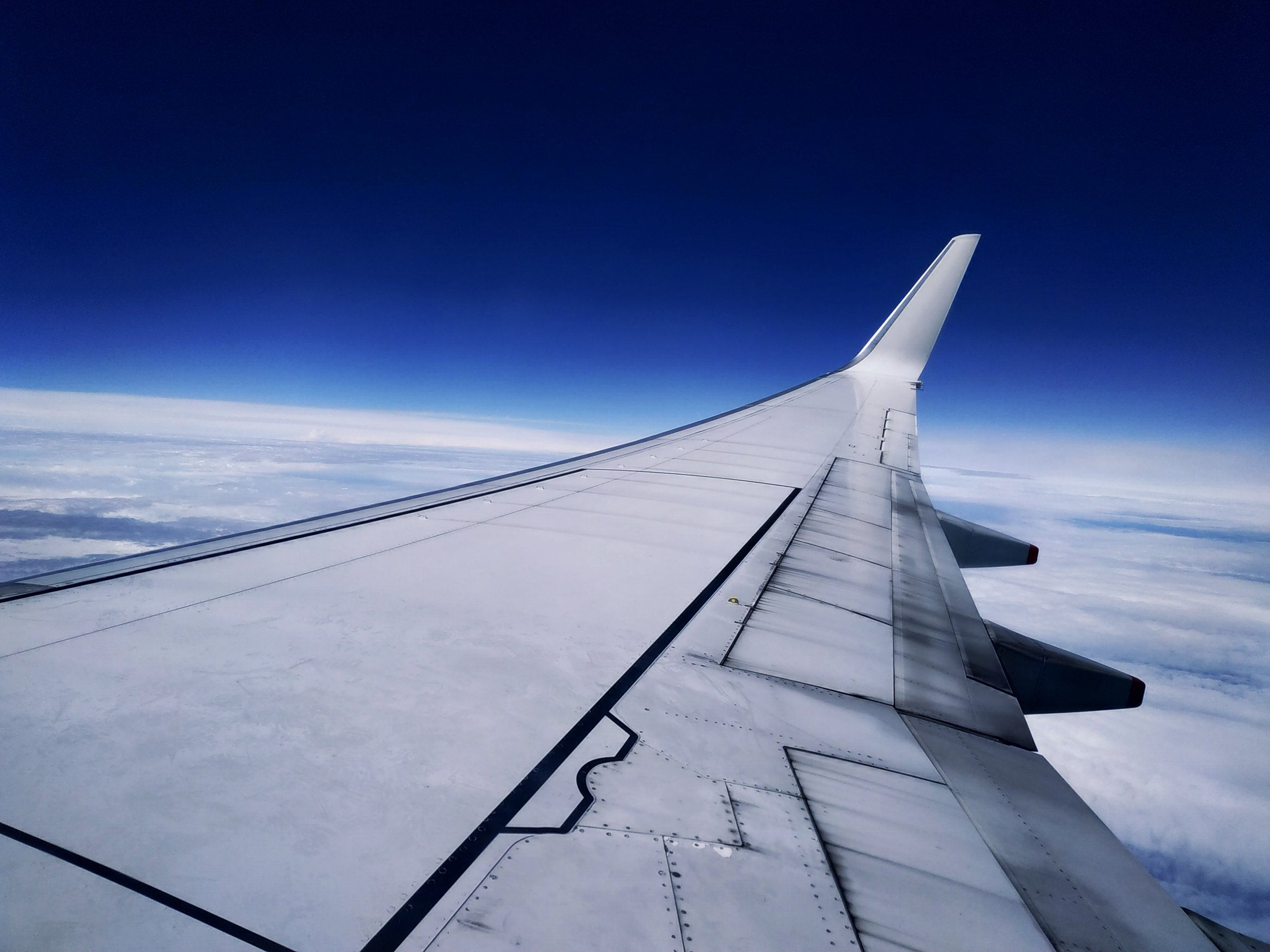
An airliner flying in the stratosphere where airliners typically cruise to reduce fuel consumption. The blue layer is the ozone layer, fading further to the mesosphere.

Vertical distance comparison

The term altitude has several distinct meanings, so it is necessary to specify which is being used unless it is obvious from the context. In aviation altitude is usually measured using a barometric altimeter set to use either the local sea level pressure or the standard sea level pressure as the basis for zero altitude. GPS and radio altimeters are also used, especially close to the ground during landings.

Barometric altitudes displayed to pilots are only approximate since the pressure variations in the atmosphere vary with location and time and the altitude shown is directly related only to the pressure, but they are a particularly useful standard for separating the paths of aircraft.

There are several types of altitude in aviation:

- Indicated altitude is the reading on the altimeter when it is set to the local barometric pressure at mean sea level. In UK aviation radiotelephony usage, the vertical distance of a level, a point or an object considered as a point, measured from mean sea level; this is referred to over the radio as altitude.(see QNH)
- Absolute altitude is the vertical distance of the aircraft above the terrain over which it is flying. It can be measured using a radar altimeter (or "absolute altimeter"). Also referred to as "radar height" or feet/metres above ground level (AGL).
- True altitude is the actual elevation above mean sea level. It is indicated altitude corrected for non-standard temperature and pressure.
- Height is the vertical distance above a reference point, commonly the terrain elevation. In UK aviation radiotelephony usage, the vertical distance of a level, a point or an object considered as a point, measured from a specified datum; this is referred to over the radio as height, where the specified datum is the airfield elevation (see QFE)
- Pressure altitude is the elevation above a standard datum air-pressure plane (typically, 1013.25 millibars or 29.92" Hg). Pressure altitude is used to indicate "flight level" which is the standard for altitude reporting in the U.S. in Class A airspace (above roughly 18,000 feet). Pressure altitude and indicated altitude are the same when the altimeter setting is 29.92" Hg or 1013.25 millibars.
- Density altitude is the altitude corrected for non-ISA International Standard Atmosphere atmospheric conditions. Aircraft performance depends on density altitude, which is affected by barometric pressure, humidity and temperature. On a very hot day, density altitude at an airport (especially one at a high elevation) may be so high as to preclude takeoff, particularly for helicopters or a heavily loaded aircraft.

These types of altitude can be explained more simply as various ways of measuring the altitude:

- Indicated altitude – the altitude shown on the altimeter.
- Absolute altitude – altitude in terms of the distance above the ground directly below
- True altitude – altitude in terms of elevation above sea level
- Height – vertical distance above a certain point
- Pressure altitude – the air pressure in terms of altitude in the International Standard Atmosphere
- Density altitude – the density of the air in terms of altitude in the International Standard Atmosphere in the air

== Satellite orbits ==
Low (cyan) and Medium (yellow) Earth orbit regions to scale. The black dashed line is the geosynchronous orbit. The green dashed line is the 20,230 km orbit used for GPS satellites.

Transatmospheric orbit (TAO)
Geocentric orbits with altitudes at apogee higher than 100 km (62 mi) and perigee that intersects with the defined atmosphere.
Low Earth orbit (LEO)
Geocentric orbits ranging in altitude from 160 km (100 mi) to 2,000 km (1,200 mi) above mean sea level. At 160 km, one revolution takes approximately 90 minutes, and the circular orbital speed is 8 km/s (26,000 ft/s).
Medium Earth orbit (MEO)
Geocentric orbits with altitudes at apogee ranging between 2,000 km (1,200 mi) and that of the geosynchronous orbit at 35,786 km (22,236 mi).
Geosynchronous orbit (GSO)
Geocentric circular orbit with an altitude of 35,786 km (22,236 mi). The period of the orbit equals one sidereal day, coinciding with the rotation period of the Earth. The speed is approximately 3 km/s (9,800 ft/s).
High Earth orbit (HEO)
Geocentric orbits with altitudes at apogee higher than that of the geosynchronous orbit. A special case of high Earth orbit is the highly elliptical orbit, where altitude at perigee is less than 2,000 km (1,200 mi).

== Atmospheric studies ==
=== Atmospheric layers ===
The Earth's atmosphere is divided into several altitude regions. These regions start and finish at varying heights depending on season and distance from the poles. The altitudes stated below are averages:

- Troposphere: surface to 8,000 metres (5.0 mi) at the poles, 18,000 metres (11 miles) at the Equator, ending at the Tropopause
- Stratosphere: Troposphere to 50 kilometres (31 mi)
- Mesosphere: Stratosphere to 85 kilometres (53 mi)
- Thermosphere: Mesosphere to 675 kilometres (419 mi)
- Exosphere: Thermosphere to 10,000 kilometres (6,200 mi)

The Kármán line, at an altitude of 100 kilometres (62 mi) above sea level, by convention defines represents the demarcation between the atmosphere and space. The thermosphere and exosphere (along with the higher parts of the mesosphere) are regions of the atmosphere that are conventionally defined as space.

=== High altitude and low pressure ===
Regions on the Earth's surface (or in its atmosphere) that are high above mean sea level are referred to as high altitude. High altitude is sometimes defined to begin at 2,400 meters (8,000 ft) above sea level.

At high altitude, atmospheric pressure is lower than that at sea level. This is due to two competing physical effects: gravity, which causes the air to be as close as possible to the ground; and the heat content of the air, which causes the molecules to bounce off each other and expand.

=== Temperature profile ===
The temperature profile of the atmosphere is a result of an interaction between radiation and convection. Sunlight in the visible spectrum hits the ground and heats it. The ground then heats the air at the surface. If radiation were the only way to transfer heat from the ground to space, the greenhouse effect of gases in the atmosphere would keep the ground at roughly 333 K (60 °C; 140 °F), and the temperature would decay exponentially with height.

However, when air is hot, it tends to expand, which lowers its density. Thus, hot air tends to rise and transfer heat upward. This is the process of convection. Convection comes to equilibrium when a parcel of air at a given altitude has the same density as its surroundings. Air is a poor conductor of heat, so a parcel of air will rise and fall without exchanging heat. This is known as an adiabatic process, which has a characteristic pressure-temperature curve. As the pressure gets lower, the temperature decreases. The rate of decrease of temperature with elevation is known as the adiabatic lapse rate, which is approximately 9.8 °C per kilometer (or 5.4 °F [3.0 °C] per 1000 feet) of altitude.

The presence of water in the atmosphere complicates the process of convection. Water vapor contains latent heat of vaporization. As air rises and cools, it eventually becomes saturated and cannot hold its quantity of water vapor. The water vapor condenses (forming clouds), and releases heat, which changes the lapse rate from the dry adiabatic lapse rate to the moist adiabatic lapse rate (5.5 °C per kilometer or 3 °F [1.7 °C] per 1000 feet). As an average, the International Civil Aviation Organization (ICAO) defines an international standard atmosphere (ISA) with a temperature lapse rate of 6.49 °C per kilometer (3.56 °F per 1,000 feet). The actual lapse rate can vary by altitude and by location.

Finally, only the troposphere (up to approximately 11 kilometres (36,000 ft) of altitude) in the Earth's atmosphere undergoes notable convection; in the stratosphere, there is little vertical convection.

== Humans ==
Medicine recognizes that altitudes above 1,500 metres (4,900 ft) start to affect humans, and there is no record of humans living at extreme altitudes above 5,500–6,000 metres (18,000–19,700 ft) for more than two years. As the altitude increases, atmospheric pressure decreases, which affects humans by reducing the partial pressure of oxygen. The lack of oxygen above 2,400 metres (8,000 ft) can cause serious illnesses such as altitude sickness, high altitude pulmonary edema, and high altitude cerebral edema. The higher the altitude, the more likely are serious effects. The human body can adapt to high altitude by breathing faster, having a higher heart rate, and adjusting its blood chemistry. It can take days or weeks to adapt to high altitude. However, above 8,000 metres (26,000 ft), (in the "death zone"), altitude acclimatization becomes impossible.

There is a significantly lower overall mortality rate for permanent residents at higher altitudes. Additionally, there is a dose response relationship between increasing elevation and decreasing obesity prevalence in the United States. In addition, the recent hypothesis suggests that high altitude could be protective against Alzheimer's disease via action of erythropoietin, a hormone released by kidney in response to hypoxia. However, people living at higher elevations have a statistically significant higher rate of suicide. The cause for the increased suicide risk is unknown so far.

=== Athletes ===
For athletes, high altitude produces two contradictory effects on performance. For explosive events (sprints up to 400 metres, long jump, triple jump) the reduction in atmospheric pressure signifies less atmospheric resistance, which generally results in improved athletic performance. For endurance events (races of 5,000 metres or more) the predominant effect is the reduction in oxygen which generally reduces the athlete's performance at high altitude. Sports organizations acknowledge the effects of altitude on performance: the International Association of Athletic Federations (IAAF), for example, marks record performances achieved at an altitude greater than 1,000 metres (3,300 ft) with the letter "A".

Athletes also can take advantage of altitude acclimatization to increase their performance. The same changes that help the body cope with high altitude increase performance back at sea level. These changes are the basis of altitude training which forms an integral part of the training of athletes in a number of endurance sports including track and field, distance running, triathlon, cycling and swimming.

== Other organisms ==
Decreased oxygen availability and decreased temperature make life at high altitude challenging. Despite these environmental conditions, many species have been successfully adapted at high altitudes. Animals have developed physiological adaptations to enhance oxygen uptake and delivery to tissues which can be used to sustain metabolism. The strategies used by animals to adapt to high altitude depend on their morphology and phylogeny. For example, small mammals face the challenge of maintaining body heat in cold temperatures, due to their small volume to surface area ratio. As oxygen is used as a source of metabolic heat production, the hypobaric hypoxia at high altitudes is problematic.

There is also a general trend of smaller body sizes and lower species richness at high altitudes, likely due to lower oxygen partial pressures. These factors may decrease productivity in high altitude habitats, meaning there will be less energy available for consumption, growth, and activity.

However, some species, such as birds, thrive at high altitude. Birds thrive because of physiological features that are advantageous for high-altitude flight.

== See also ==
- Atmosphere of Earth
- Coffin corner (aerodynamics) At higher altitudes, the air density is lower than at sea level. At a certain altitude it is very difficult to keep an airplane in stable flight.
- Geocentric altitude
- Near space
