= High-altitude pulmonary edema =

Human disease

- Other names: High-altitude pulmonary oedema (HAPO)
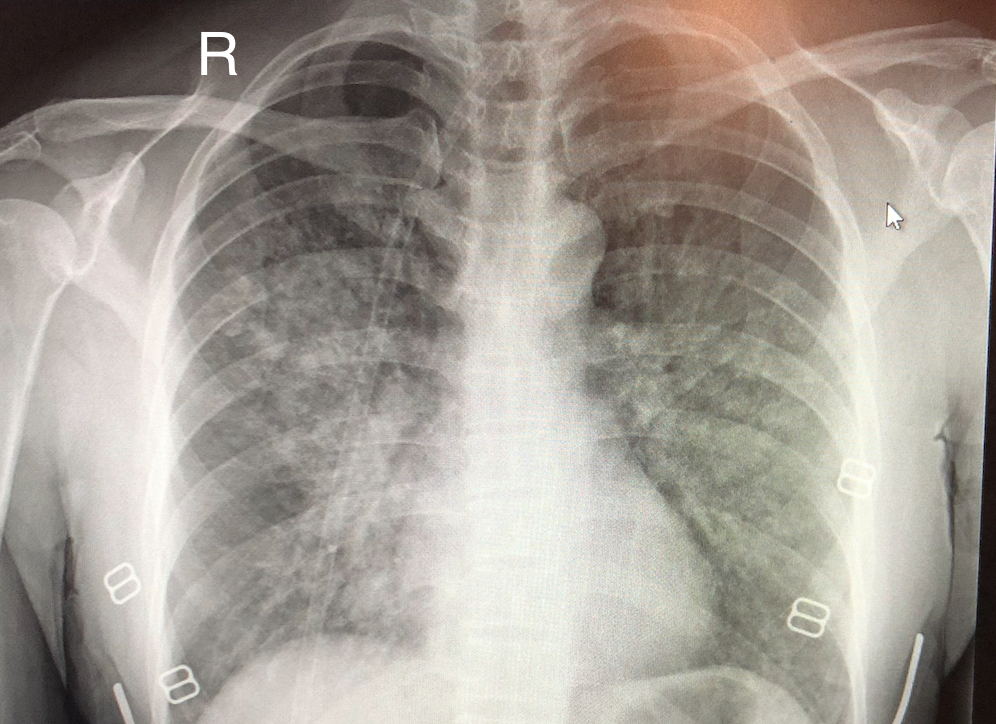
- Chest x-ray of HAPE showing characteristic patchy alveolar infiltrates with right middle lobe predominance.
- Specialty: Emergency medicine, wilderness medicine

High-altitude pulmonary edema (HAPE) is a life-threatening form of non-cardiogenic pulmonary edema that occurs in otherwise healthy people at altitudes typically above 2,500 meters (8,200 ft). HAPE is a severe presentation of altitude sickness. Cases have also been reported between 1,500–2,500 metres or 4,900–8,200 feet in people who are at a higher risk or are more vulnerable to the effects of high altitude.

Classically, HAPE occurs in people normally living at low altitude who travel to an altitude above 2,500 meters (8,200 feet). Re-entry HAPE has been described in people who normally live at high altitude but who develop pulmonary edema after returning from a stay at low altitude. Symptoms include crackling sounds when breathing, dyspnea (at rest), and cyanosis. The primary treatment is descent to a lower altitude, with oxygen therapy and medication as alternatives. If HAPE is not treated, there is a 50% risk of mortality.

There are many factors that can make a person more susceptible to developing HAPE, including genetic factors. The understanding of the risk factors and how to prevent HAPE is not clear. HAPE remains the major cause of death related to high-altitude exposure, with a high mortality rate in the absence of adequate emergency treatment.

== Signs and symptoms ==
Defining altitude
| High altitude | 1,500 to 3,500 metres (4,900 to 11,500 ft) |
| Very high altitude | 3,500 to 5,500 metres (11,500 to 18,000 ft) |
| Extreme altitude | 5,500 to 8,850 metres (18,000 to 29,000 ft) |

Physiological and symptomatic changes often vary according to the altitude involved.

The Lake Louise Consensus Definition for high-altitude pulmonary edema has set widely used criteria for defining HAPE symptoms.

In the presence of a recent gain in altitude, the presence of the following:

Symptoms: at least two of:

- Shortness of breath at rest
- Cough
- Weakness or decreased exercise performance
- Chest tightness or congestion

Signs: at least two of:

- Crackles or wheezing (while breathing) in at least one lung field
- Central blue skin color
- Tachypnea (rapid breathing)
- Tachycardia (rapid heart rate)

Acute mountain sickness and high altitude cerebral edema may also be present in conjunction with HAPE, however these symptoms may be subtle or not present at all. The most reliable sign of HAPE is severe fatigue or exercise intolerance, especially in someone that was previously not displaying this symptom.

== Risk factors ==
There are multiple factors that can contribute to the development of HAPE, including sex (male), genetic factors, prior development of HAPE, ascent rate, cold exposure, peak altitude, intensity of physical exertion, and certain underlying medical conditions (e.g., pulmonary hypertension). Anatomic abnormalities that are predisposing include congenital absence of pulmonary artery, and left-to-right intracardiac shunts (e.g., atrial and ventricular septal defects), both of which increase pulmonary blood flow. HAPE-susceptible (HAPE-s) individuals were also found to be four times more likely to have a patent foramen ovale (PFO) than those who were HAPE-resistant. There is currently no indication or recommendation for people with PFO to pursue closure prior to extreme altitude exposure.

In studies performed at sea level, HAPE-s people were found to have exaggerated circulatory response to both hypoxia at rest and during exercise. In these individuals, the pulmonary artery pressure (PAP) and pulmonary vascular resistance (PVR) were shown to be abnormally high. Microneurographic recordings in these individuals developed a direct link between PAP rise and sympathetic nervous system over-activation, which could explain the exaggerated response to hypoxia in these people.

Endothelial tissue dysfunction has also been linked to development of HAPE, including reduced synthesis of NO (a potent vasodilator), increased levels of endothelin (a potent vasconstrictor), and an impaired ability to transport sodium and water across the epithelium and out of the alveoli.

Data on the genetic basis for HAPE susceptibility is conflicting and interpretation is difficult. Genes implicated in the development of HAPE include those in the renin-angiotensin system (RAS), NO pathway, and hypoxia-inducible factor pathway (HIF). Future genomic testing could provide a clearer picture of the genetic factors that contribute to HAPE.

== Pathophysiology ==
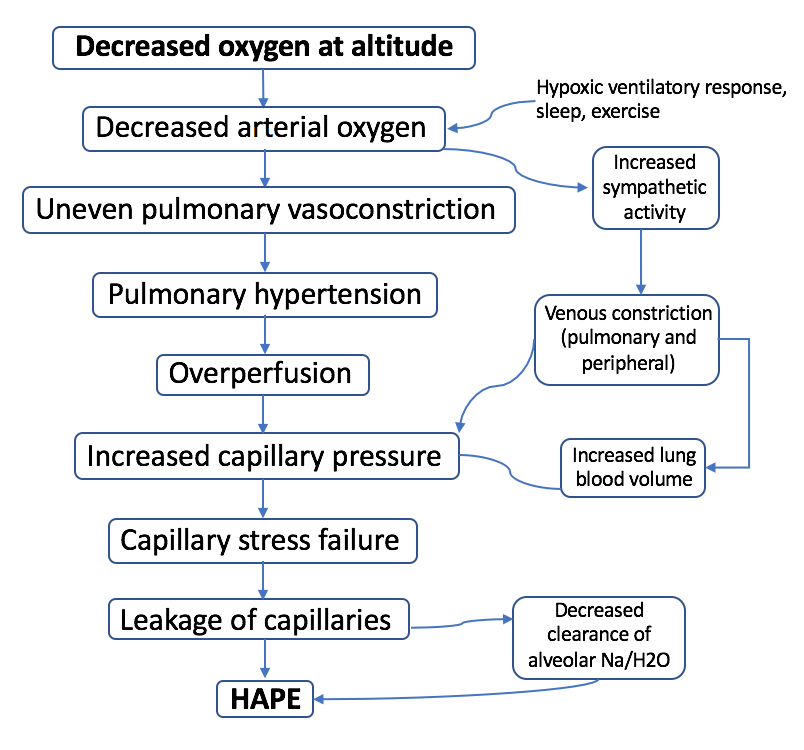
Currently proposed pathophysiology of HAPE.

Though it remains a topic of intense investigation, multiple studies and reviews over the last several years have helped to elucidate the proposed mechanism of HAPE. The inciting factor of HAPE is the decrease in partial pressure of arterial oxygen caused by the lower air pressure at high altitudes (pulmonary gas pressures). The resultant hypoxemia is then thought to precipitate the development of:

1. Increased pulmonary arterial and capillary pressures (pulmonary hypertension) secondary to hypoxic pulmonary vasoconstriction.
2. Increased capillary pressure (hydrostatic pressure) with over-distention of the capillary beds and increased permeability of the vascular endothelium, also known as "stress failure." This leads to subsequent leakage of cells and proteins into the alveoli, a.k.a. pulmonary edema.

Hypoxic pulmonary vasoconstriction (HPV) occurs diffusely, leading to arterial vasoconstriction in all areas of the lung. This is evidenced by the appearance of "diffuse," "fluffy," and "patchy" infiltrates described on imaging studies of climbers with known HAPE.

Although higher pulmonary arterial pressures are associated with the development of HAPE, the presence of pulmonary hypertension may not in itself be sufficient to explain the development of edema; severe pulmonary hypertension can exist in the absence of clinical HAPE in subjects at high altitude.

== Diagnosis ==
Expected SpO_{2} and PaO_{2} levels at altitude
| Altitude | SpO_{2} | PaO_{2} (mm Hg) |
|---|---|---|
| 1,500 to 3,500 m 4,900 to 11,500 ft | about 90% | 55–75 |
| 3,500 to 5,500 m 11,500 to 18,000 ft | 75–85% | 40–60 |
| 5,500 to 8,850 m 18,000 to 29,000 ft | 58–75% | 28–40 |

The diagnosis of HAPE is entirely based on symptoms and many of the symptoms overlap with other diagnoses. Before HAPE was understood it was commonly confused with pneumonia which resulted in inappropriate treatment.

HAPE generally develops in the first 2 to 4 days of hiking at altitudes >2,500 meters (8,200 feet), and symptoms seem to worsen most commonly on the second night. Initial symptoms are vague and include shortness of breath, decreased exercise ability, increased recovery time, fatigue, and weakness, especially with walking uphill. People then develop a dry, persistent cough, and often cyanosis of the lips. Another cardinal feature of HAPE is the rapid progression to dyspnea at rest. The development of pink, frothy, or frankly bloody sputum are late features of HAPE. In some cases, people will develop concomitant neurological features such as poor coordination, altered consciousness, or cerebral edema (High-altitude cerebral edema).

On physical exam, increased breathing rates, increased heart rates, and a low-grade fever 38.5^{o} C (101.3^{o} F) are common. Listening to the lungs may reveal crackles in one or both lungs, often starting in the right middle lobe. Imaging studies such as X-ray and CT imaging of the chest may reveal thoracic infiltrates that can be seen as opaque patches. One distinct feature of HAPE is that pulse oximetry saturation levels (SpO_{2}) are often decreased from what would be expected for the altitude. People typically do not appear as ill as SpO_{2} and chest X-ray films would suggest. Giving extra oxygen rapidly improves symptoms and SpO_{2} values; in the setting of infiltrative changes on chest X-ray, this is nearly pathognomonic for HAPE.

=== Severity ===
The severity of HAPE is graded. The grades of mild, moderate, or severe HAPE are assigned based upon symptoms, clinical signs, and chest x-ray results for individuals. The symptoms that are taken in to account while evaluation the severity of HAPE are difficulty breathing while exerting or while at rest, the presence of a cough and the quality of that cough, and the level of fatigue of the patient. On physical exam of a suspected HAPE patient the exam findings used to grade the severity are the heart rate, respiratory rate, signs of cyanosis, and severity of lung sounds. Both symptoms and signs on physical exam can be used to evaluate a patient in the field. Chest X-rays are also used to evaluate the severity of HAPE when they are available.

=== Differential diagnosis ===
Differential diagnosis:

- Pneumonia
- Bronchitis
- Mucous plugging
- Pulmonary embolism
- Acute coronary syndrome
- Acute decompensated heart failure
- Asthma
- Reactive airway disease
- Exercise-associated hyponatremia
- Pneumothorax

== Prevention ==
The primary recommendation for the prevention of HAPE is gradual ascent. The suggested rate of ascent is the same that applies to the prevention of acute mountain sickness and high-altitude cerebral edema.

The Wilderness Medical Society (WMS) recommends that, above 3,000 metres (9,800 ft), climbers

- not increase the sleeping elevation by more than 500 metres (1,600 ft) a day, and
- include a day with no additional ascent every 3–4 days.

In the event that adherence to these recommendations is limited by terrain or logistical factors, the WMS recommends rest days either before or after days with large gains. Overall, WMS recommends that the average ascent rate of the entire trip be less than 500 metres (1,600 ft) per day.

The most studied and preferred medication for prevention of HAPE is nifedipine, a pulmonary vasodilator which prevents the altitude induced pulmonary hypertension. The recommendation for its use is strongest for individuals with a history of HAPE. According to published data, treatment is most effective if given one day prior to ascent and continued for four to five days, or until descent below 2,500 meters (8,200 feet).

Additional medications that are being considered for prevention but require further research to determine efficacy and treatment guidelines include acetazolamide, salmeterol, tadalafil (and other PDE5 inhibitors), and dexamethasone. Acetazolamide has proven to be clinically effective, but formal studies are lacking. Salmeterol is considered an adjunctive therapy to nifedipine, though only in highly susceptible climbers with clearly demonstrated recurrence of HAPE. Tadalafil was found to be effective at preventing HAPE in HAPE-s individuals during rapid ascent, but optimal dosing and frequency has yet to be established. Use of dexamethasone is currently indicated for the treatment of moderate-to-severe acute mountain sickness, as well as high-altitude cerebral edema. It has also been found to prevent HAPE, but its routine use is not yet recommended.

Each of these medications acts to block hypoxic pulmonary hypertension, lending evidence to the proposed pathophysiology of HAPE outlined above.

It is recommended that those who go to high altitude avoid alcohol or sleeping medications.

== Treatment ==
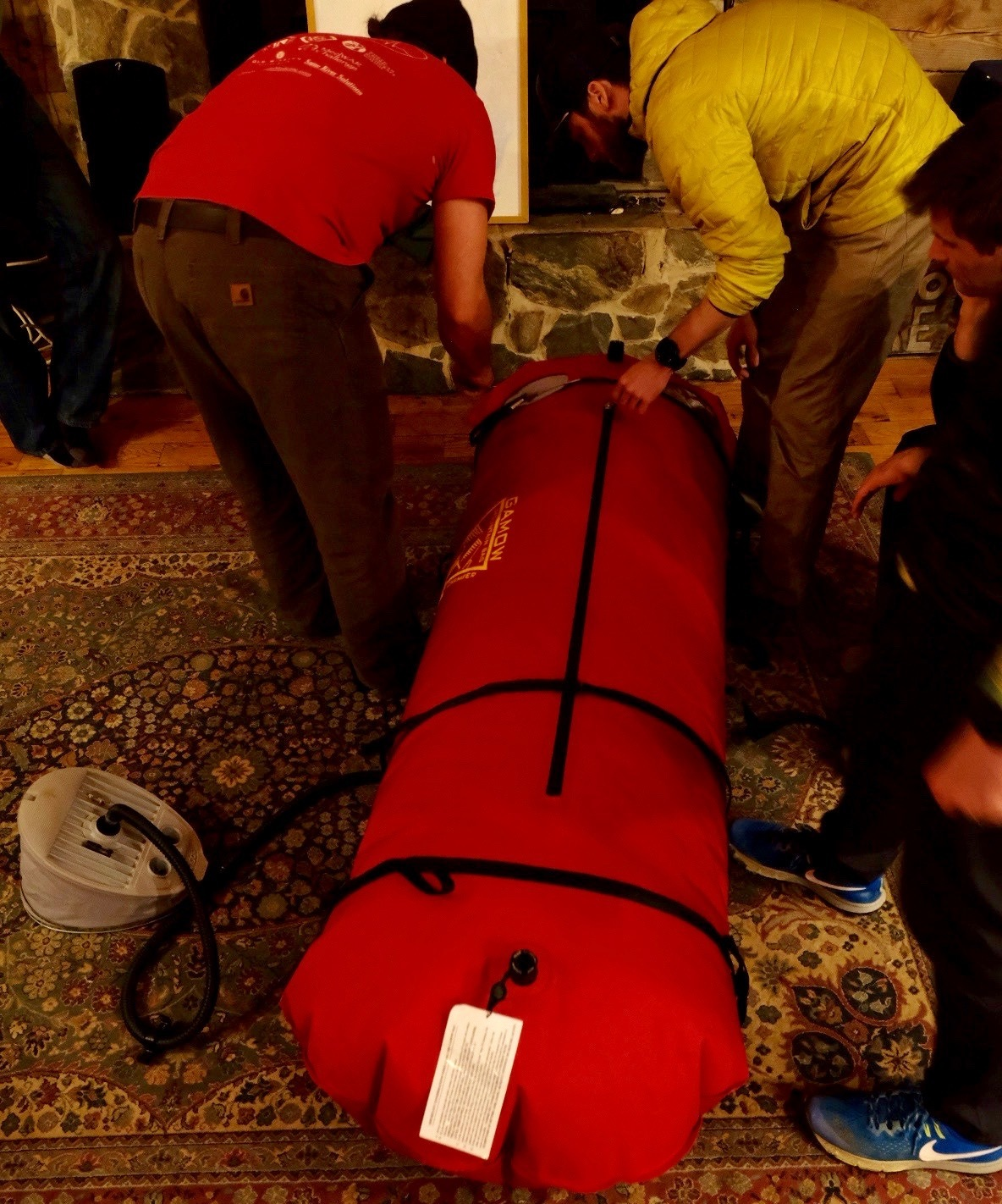
Demonstrating the use of a portable hyperbaric chamber.

The recommended first line treatment is descent to a lower altitude as quickly as possible, with symptomatic improvement seen in as few as 500 to 1,000 meters (1,600 to 3,300 ft). However, descent is not mandatory in people with mild HAPE and treatment with warming techniques, rest, and supplemental oxygen can improve symptoms. Giving oxygen at flow rates high enough to maintain an SpO_{2} at or above 90% is a fair substitute for descent. In the hospital setting, oxygen is generally given by nasal cannula or face mask for several hours until the person is able to maintain oxygen saturations above 90% while breathing the surrounding air. In remote settings where resources are scarce and descent is not feasible, a reasonable substitute can be the use of a portable hyperbaric chamber, which simulates descent, combined with additional oxygen and medications.

As with prevention, the standard medication once a climber has developed HAPE is nifedipine, although its use is best in combination with and does not substitute for descent, hyperbaric therapy, or oxygen therapy. Though they have not formally been studied for the treatment of HAPE, phosphodiesterase type 5 inhibitors such as sildenafil and tadalafil are also effective and can be considered as add-on treatment if first-line therapy is not possible; however, they may worsen the headache of mountain sickness. There is no established role for the inhaled beta-agonist salmeterol, though its use can be considered.

Dexamethasone has a potential role in HAPE, though there are currently no studies to support its effectiveness as treatment. However, as outlined in the 2014 WMS Practice Guidelines, its use is recommended for the treatment of people with concomitant HAPE and HACE at the treatment doses recommended for HACE alone. Additionally, they support its use in HAPE with neurologic symptoms or hypoxic encephalopathy that cannot be distinguished from HACE.

== Epidemiology ==
Rates of HAPE differs depending on altitude and speed of ascent. In general, there is about a 0.2 to 6 percent incidence at 4,500 metres (14,800 ft), and about 2 to 15 percent at 5,500 metres (18,000 ft). The higher incidence of 6% has been seen when climbers ascend at a rate greater than 600m/day. It has been reported that about 1 in 10,000 skiers who travel to moderate altitudes in Colorado develop HAPE; one study reported 150 cases over 39 months at a Colorado resort located at 2,928 metres (9,606 ft). About 1 in 50 climbers who ascended Denali [6,194 metres or 20,322 feet] developed pulmonary edema, and as high as 6% of climbers ascending rapidly in the Alps [4,559 metres or 14,957 feet]. In climbers who had previously developed HAPE, re-attack rate was up to 60% with ascent to 4,559 metres (14,957 ft) in a 36-hour time period, though this risk was significantly reduced with slower ascent rates. It is believed that up to 50% of people suffer from subclinical HAPE with mild edema to the lungs but no clinical impairment.

== History ==
HAPE was recognized by physicians dating back to the 19th century but was originally attributed to “high altitude pneumonia”. The first documented case of pulmonary edema, confirmed by autopsy, was probably that of Dr Jacottet who died in 1891 in the Observatoire Vallot below the summit of Mont Blanc. After participating in a rescue on the mountain, the doctor refused to return. Instead, he spent further two nights at an altitude of 4,300 metres (14,100 ft) with obvious symptoms of acute mountain sickness (AMS) and died on the second night. This condition was subsequently noticed in otherwise healthy climbers who would die shortly after arriving at high altitudes. It was not until 1960 that Charles Houston, an internal medicine physician in Aspen and high altitude mountaineer, published a case report of 4 individuals participating in high elevation activities that he had diagnosed with “edema of the lungs”. He described chest X-rays with edema and non-specific changes on EKG. Even though these cases had been termed high altitude pneumonia in the past, Houston indicated that these cases were “acute pulmonary edema without heart disease”.

== See also ==
- Hazards of outdoor recreation
- High-altitude cerebral edema (HACE)
- High-altitude flatus expulsion (HAFE)
