= Portable hyperbaric bag =

Inflatable pressure bag

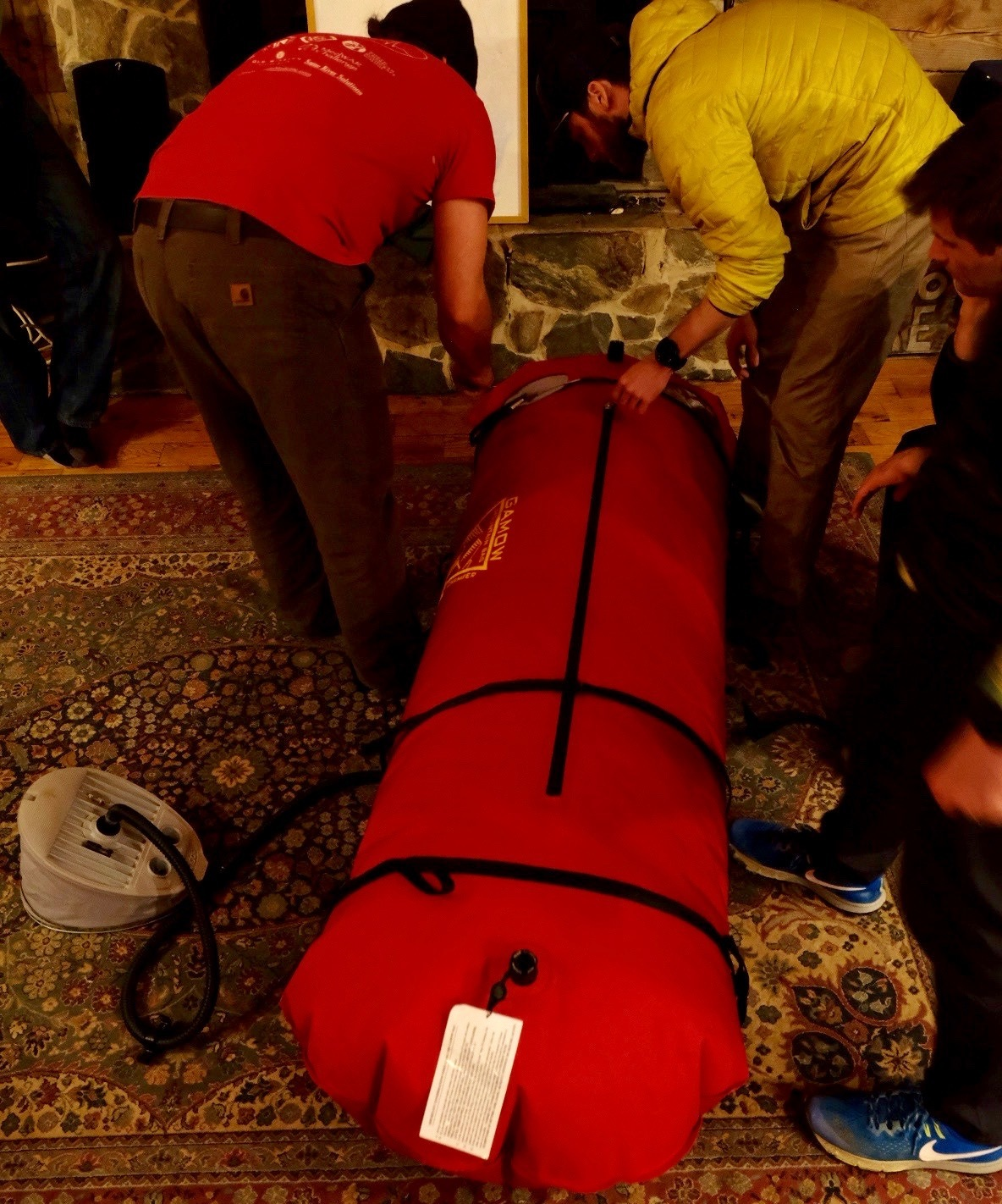
Medical students demonstrate the use of a portable hyperbaric bag

A portable hyperbaric bag, of which one brand is the Gamow (pronounced [ˈɡamɔf]) bag, is an inflatable pressure bag large enough to accommodate a person. The patient can be placed inside the bag, which is then sealed and inflated with a foot pump. Within minutes, the effective altitude can be decreased by 1000 m to as much as 3000 m (3281 to 9743 feet) depending on the elevation. The bag is pressurised to 14.0–29.3 kPa (105–220 mmHg); the pressure gradient is regulated by pop-off valves set to the target pressure.

== History ==
The Gamow bag was named after its inventor, Igor Gamow, son of George Gamow. Igor Gamow originally designed a predecessor to the Gamow bag called "The Bubble" to study the effect of high altitude on stamina and performance in athletes. Gamow later re-designed "The Bubble" into a bag that could be used in high-altitude wilderness.

== Application ==
It is primarily used for treating severe cases of altitude sickness, high-altitude cerebral edema, and high-altitude pulmonary edema. Like office-based hyperbaric medicine, the Gamow bag uses increased partial pressure of oxygen for therapy of hypobaric injury but has the advantage of portability for field use. Patients typically are treated in 1-hour increments and then are reevaluated.

== See also ==
- Altitude tent
- Wilderness medicine
