= High-altitude flatus expulsion =

Gastrointestinal syndrome

High-altitude flatus expulsion (HAFE) is a gastrointestinal syndrome which involves the spontaneous passage of increased quantities of rectal gases at high altitudes.

== Syndrome ==
High-altitude flatus expulsion was first described by Joseph Hamel in c. 1820 and occasionally described afterward. A landmark study of this phenomenon was published in 1981 by Paul Auerbach and York Miller.

The feeling of fullness or need to expel brought on by this differential in atmospheric pressure has been verified by studies involving military pilots subjected to pressure changes simulating flight.

== See also ==
- High-altitude pulmonary edema
- High-altitude cerebral edema
