= Hypoxic pulmonary vasoconstriction =

Physiological phenomenon

Hypoxic pulmonary vasoconstriction (HPV), also known as the Euler–Liljestrand mechanism, is a physiological phenomenon in which small pulmonary arteries constrict in the presence of alveolar hypoxia (low oxygen levels). By redirecting blood flow from poorly-ventilated lung regions to well-ventilated lung regions, HPV is thought to be the primary mechanism underlying ventilation/perfusion matching.

The process might initially seem counterintuitive, as low oxygen levels might theoretically stimulate increased blood flow to the lungs to increase gas exchange. However, the purpose of HPV is to distribute blood flow regionally to increase the overall efficiency of gas exchange between air and blood. While the maintenance of ventilation/perfusion ratio during regional obstruction of airflow is beneficial, HPV can be detrimental during global alveolar hypoxia which occurs with exposure to high altitude, where HPV causes a significant increase in total pulmonary vascular resistance, and pulmonary arterial pressure, potentially leading to pulmonary hypertension and pulmonary edema.

Several factors inhibit HPV including increased cardiac output, hypocapnia, hypothermia, acidosis/alkalosis, increased pulmonary vascular resistance, inhaled anesthetics, calcium channel blockers, positive end-expiratory pressure (PEEP), high-frequency ventilation (HFV), isoproterenol, nitric oxide, and vasodilators.

== Molecular mechanism ==
The classical explanation of HPV involves inhibition of hypoxia-sensitive voltage-gated potassium channels in pulmonary artery smooth muscle cells leading to depolarization. This depolarization activates voltage-dependent calcium channels, which increases intracellular calcium and activates smooth muscle contractile machinery which in turn causes vasoconstriction. However, later studies have reported additional ion channels and mechanisms that contribute to HPV, such as transient receptor potential canonical 6 (TRPC6) channels, and transient receptor potential vanilloid 4 (TRPV4) channels. Recently it was proposed that hypoxia is sensed at the alveolar/capillary level, generating an electrical signal that is transduced to pulmonary arterioles through gap junctions in the pulmonary endothelium to cause HPV. This contrasts with the classical explanation of HPV which presumes that hypoxia is sensed at the pulmonary artery smooth muscle cell itself. Specialized epithelial cells (neuroepithelial bodies) that release serotonin have been suggested to contribute to hypoxic pulmonary venoconstriction.

== High altitude pulmonary edema ==
High-altitude mountaineering can induce pulmonary hypoxia due to decreased atmospheric pressure. This hypoxia causes vasoconstriction that ultimately leads to high altitude pulmonary edema (HAPE). For this reason, some climbers carry supplemental oxygen to prevent hypoxia, edema, and HAPE. The standard drug treatment of dexamethasone does not alter the hypoxia or the consequent vasoconstriction, but stimulates fluid reabsorption in the lungs to reverse the edema. Additionally, several studies on native populations remaining at high altitudes have demonstrated to varying degrees the blunting of the HPV response.
