= Oxygen tent =

Canopy over a patient to provide supplemental oxygen

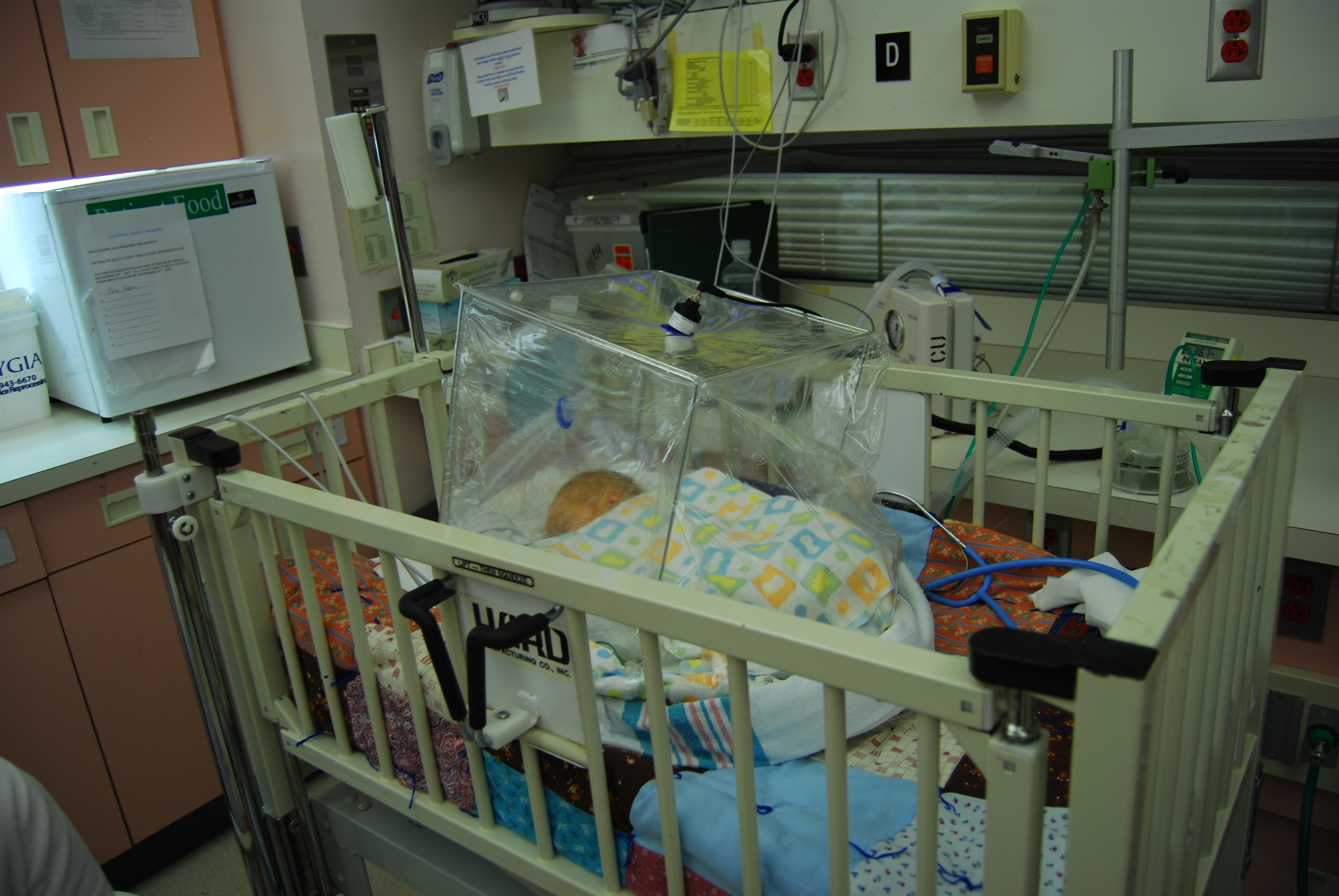
An infant placed under an oxygen tent

An oxygen tent consists of a canopy placed over the head and shoulders, or over the entire body of a patient to provide oxygen at a higher level than normal. Some devices cover only a part of the face. Oxygen tents are sometimes confused with altitude tents as used by athletes and those looking to acclimatize to a higher altitude, but those contain a reduced oxygen content.

This form of treatment is often prescribed in conditions where people have difficulty in breathing. An oxygen tent can be used in either a hospital setting or outside a health-care facility, and can be recommended for short- or long-term therapy.

Typically the tent is made of transparent plastic material. It can envelop the patient's bed with the end sections held in place by a mattress to ensure that the tent is airtight. The enclosure often has a side opening with a zipper.

== Benefits ==
Oxygen therapy often benefits patients by providing more oxygen to their lungs and consequently to their tissues. Typically, the treatment raises the amount of oxygen in the blood, decreases load on the heart, and facilitates breathing. It can ease symptoms such as cough and dried up secretions that occur in respiratory conditions. Oxygen therapy might be advised for lung diseases, heart conditions, carbon monoxide poisoning, and could be administered to patients in case of surgery. A person with viral or bacterial meningitis who develops breathing difficulty might be kept in an oxygen tent.

== Hazards ==
Raised levels of oxygen increase fire risk, both of ignition and of spreading rate and damage. Many materials that will not burn in air will ignite and burn in a high oxygen atmosphere. Extinguishing a fire is more difficult in a high oxygen environment.

== Precautions ==
Certain precautions are usually recommended when using an oxygen tent. One of the measures is to avoid opening the tent very often. If the tent is opened to attend to the patient, the edges need to be tucked back to prevent oxygen from seeping out. In general, it is advisable not to smoke or have any flammable material within the vicinity of any oxygen apparatus. Using an electrical device inside an oxygen tent also could be hazardous.

== See also ==
- Oxygen therapy – Use of oxygen as a medical treatment
- Oxygen mask – Interface between the oxygen delivery system and the human user
