= Altitude tent =

Sealed tent used to simulate a higher altitude with reduced oxygen

An altitude tent is a sealed tent used to simulate a higher altitude with reduced oxygen. Living or training at altitude causes the body to adapt to the lower oxygen content by producing more oxygen-carrying red blood cells and hemoglobin, thus causing the body to adapt to the higher altitude and enhancing performance when returning to a lower altitude. Mountain climbers can use them to avoid altitude sickness, and athletes can use them to enhance performance at lower altitudes.

== History ==
Altitude tents were first marketed in the mid-1990s, and are provided by many different companies in a number of designs.

== Rationale ==
Sleeping in a simulated altitude environment allows the body to achieve some of the positive adaptations to altitude while still permitting the athlete to perform workouts at an oxygen-rich lower altitude where muscles can perform at their normal work level. An altitude tent is one way to enable athletes living at any elevation to sleep in a high altitude-like environment. A more expensive option gaining popularity among professional athletes is to convert their entire bedroom to altitude.

== Operation ==
Rather than simulating altitude with low air pressure (which would require substantial engineering and the use of an airlock to prevent implosion), the altitude tent remains at the ambient air pressure, substituting low pressure with low concentration of oxygen. While normal air contains 20.9% oxygen independent of altitude, the air in an altitude tent contains as little as 12% oxygen (the remainder being nitrogen). The partial pressure of oxygen inside the tent is the same as it is at the natural elevation that the tent is simulating.

Most altitude tents are normobaric, which means they create a low-oxygen environment with a “hypoxic air generator” outside the tent pumping the hypoxic (low oxygen) air into the tent which replaces some of the oxygen with nitrogen. The more oxygen-rich air inside the tent is displaced and with it, the excess carbon dioxide exhaled by the occupant(s). Most athletes use altitudes between 8,000 and 15,000 feet. To cause a physiological response, the altitude must be sufficient to reduce blood oxygen saturation (sometimes measured by a pulse oximeter) to approximately 90%.

In preparation to mountaineering, short-term use (1 week) of an altitude tent for overnight exposure (7.5 hours per night at 3000 m) prior to ascent to actual altitude can increase blood oxygen saturation during sleep and lessen symptoms of acute mountain sickness upon waking, but does not improve exercise performance at altitude.

== Types of altitude tents ==
The tents themselves come in several styles. Unlike camping tents, altitude tents cannot have much ventilation and often substitute clear plastic windows for the typical nylon and mesh vents. Displaced air escapes the tent through small outlets, seams, or zippers. Air delivery can be through hoses long enough to allow the generator to be placed in a different room, reducing noise. Smaller tents are placed on the bed, with the floor of the tent between mattress and box springs. Larger tents are of a cube shape, often tall enough to stand up in, and set up on the floor with the entire bed, and often a nightstand or two, placed inside. One or more zippered doors allow the occupants to enter and exit with limited loss of effective altitude.

One challenge with altitude tents is the buildup of heat and humidity. Because of the use of plastic panels to reduce exchange with the room, heat and humidity can build up in an altitude tent. Some tents allow the use of air conditioners to maintain comfortable conditions. Carbon dioxide from the exhaled air can also build up to uncomfortable levels if air exchange is too low. In recent years, advances in altitude tent design, and in the performance of the hypoxic air-supply units, have all resulted in greater air-exchange and significantly lower noise levels.

== Debate ==
The ethics of the use of these devices by athletes has been discussed by the World Anti-Doping Agency (WADA), which claimed that it could be equivalent to blood doping and therefore they should be banned; however, on September 16, 2006, Dick Pound of the WADA announced that "…the overwhelming consensus of our health, medicine and research committees – was that, at this time, it is not appropriate to do so."

The USADA report on doping in the Lance Armstrong case also indicates that sleeping in an altitude tent can be used to hide doping using erythropoietin (EPO), as natural EPO production is increased, confusing the tests.

== See also ==
- Gamow bag
- Altitude training
- Hypoxicator
- Hyperbaric oxygen therapy
- Oxygen tent
