= High-altitude cerebral edema =

- Other names: High-altitude cerebral oedema (HACO)

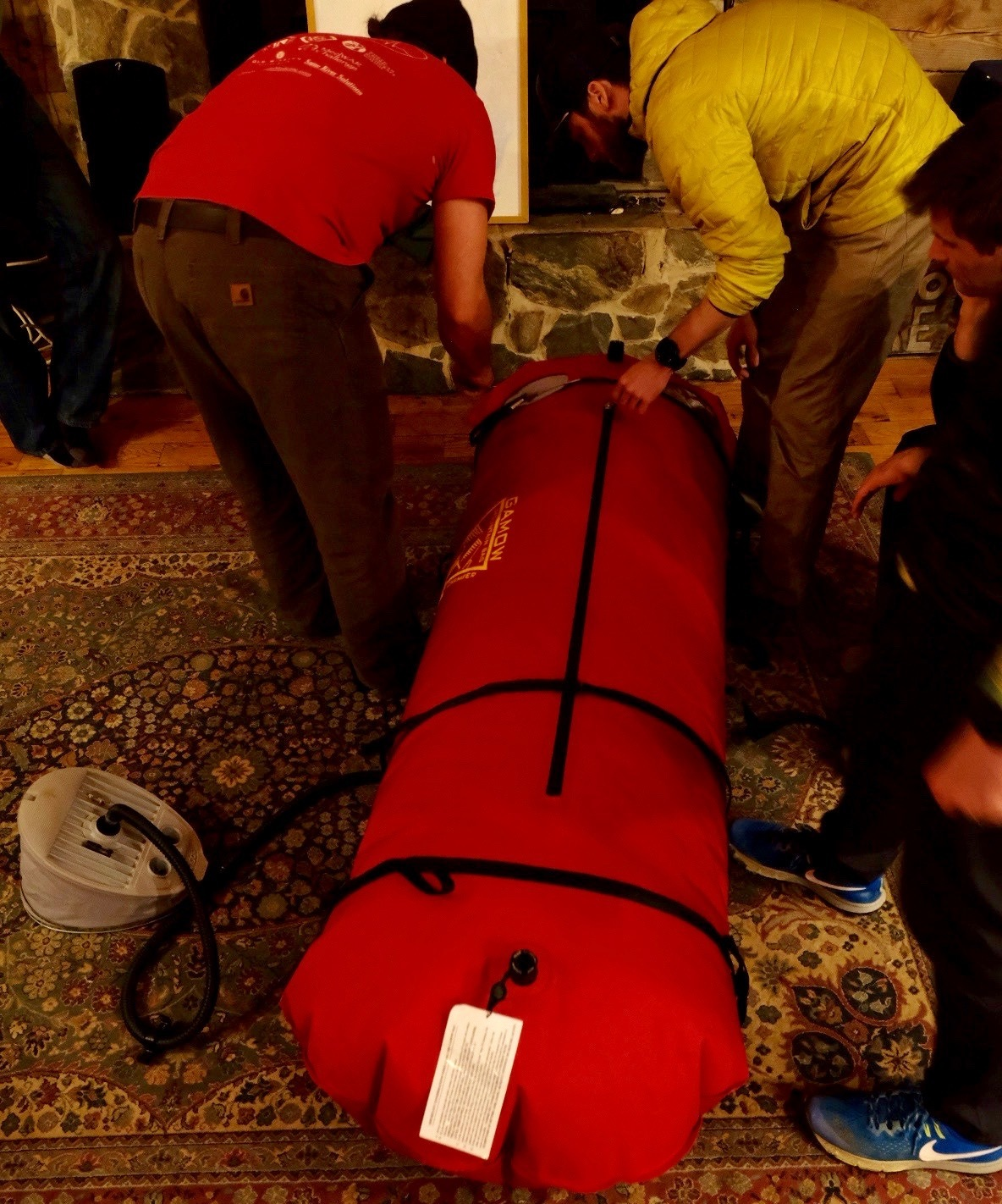
Medical students demonstrate the use of a portable hyperbaric chamber.

High-altitude cerebral edema (HACE) is a medical condition in which the brain swells with fluid because of the physiological effects of traveling to a high altitude. It generally appears in patients who have acute mountain sickness and involves disorientation, lethargy, and nausea among other symptoms. It occurs when the body fails to acclimatize while ascending to a high altitude.

It appears to be a vasogenic edema (fluid penetration of the blood–brain barrier), although cytotoxic edema (cellular retention of fluids) may play a role as well. Individuals with the condition must immediately descend to a lower altitude or coma and death can occur. Patients are usually given supplemental oxygen and dexamethasone as well.

HACE can be prevented by ascending to heights slowly to allow the body more time to acclimatize. Acetazolamide also helps prevent the condition. Untreated patients usually die within 48 hours. Those who receive treatment may take weeks to fully recover. It is a rare condition, occurring in less than one percent of people who ascend to 4,000 metres (13,000 ft). Although it was first described in 1913, little was known about the cause of the condition until MRI studies were performed in the 1990s.

== Signs and symptoms ==
Early symptoms of HACE generally correspond with those of moderate to severe acute mountain sickness (AMS). Initial symptoms of HACE commonly include confusion, loss of consciousness, fever, ataxia, photophobia, rapid heart beat, lassitude, and an altered mental state. Those affected generally attempt to cease physical activities, regardless of their necessity for survival. Severe headaches develop and people lose the ability to sit up. Retinal venous dilation occurs in 59% of people with HACE. Rarer symptoms include brisk deep tendon reflexes, retinal hemorrhages, blurred vision, extension plantar reflexes, and ocular paralysis. Cranial nerve palsies occur in some unusual cases.

In the bestselling 1996 non-fiction book Into Thin Air: A Personal Account of the Mt. Everest Disaster, Jon Krakauer describes the effects of HACE upon Dale Kruse, a forty-four-year-old dentist and one of the members of Scott Fischer's team:
'Kruse was having an incredibly difficult time simply trying to dress himself. He put his climbing harness on inside out, threaded it through the fly of his wind suit, and failed to fasten the buckle; fortunately, Fischer and Neal Beidleman noticed the screwup before Kruse started to descend. "If he'd tried to rappel down the ropes like that," says Beidleman, "he would have immediately popped out of his harness and fallen to the bottom of the Lhotse Face." '"It was like I was very drunk," Kruse recollects. "I couldn't walk without stumbling, and completely lost the ability to think or speak. It was a really strange feeling. I'd have some word in my mind, but I couldn't figure out how to bring it to my lips. So Scott and Neal had to get me dressed and make sure my harness was on correctly, then Scott lowered me down the fixed ropes." By the time Kruse arrived in Base Camp, he says, "it was still another three or four days before I could walk from my tent to the mess tent without stumbling all over the place."'

Patients with HACE have an elevated white blood cell count, but otherwise their blood count and biochemistry are normal. If a lumbar puncture is performed, it will show normal cerebral spinal fluid and cell counts but an increase in pressure. In one study, CT scans of patients with HACE exhibited ventricle compression and low density in the cerebellum. Only a few autopsies have been performed on fatal cases of HACE; they showed swollen gyri, spongiosis of white matter, and compressed sulci. There was some variation between individuals, and the results may not be typical of HACE deaths.

== Mechanism ==
Most people who travel to high altitudes acclimatize. Acclimatization precludes the development of HACE by maintaining adequate levels of cerebral oxygen. The primary cause of HACE is hypoxia (oxygen deprivation). This occurs after the body is exposed to a low-oxygen environment and before it acclimatizes. The rate of change from a normal oxygen environment and how little oxygen is in the new environment can be used to predict the chance of developing HACE. Prolonged exertion in low oxygen also causes serious hypocapnia, lower carbon dioxide in the bloodstream, which may play a role in HACE. These factors cause the brain to swell with fluid, resulting in severe impairment. If the swelling is untreated, it causes death by brain herniation.

The brain swelling is likely a result of vasogenic edema, the penetration of the blood–brain barrier by fluids. This process has been observed in MRI studies. Hypoxia increases extracellular fluid, which passes through the vasogenic endothelium in the brain. The leaking may be caused by increased pressure, or it may be caused by inflammation that makes the endothelium vulnerable to leaking. An MRI study found microhemorrhages in the corpus callosum of HACE patients, and hypoxia may also cause microvascular permeability. It has been hypothesized that vascular endothelial growth factor may cause the vascular permeability at the root of HACE. MRI scans of patients with HACE showed increased T2 in the corpus callosum, although grey matter was unchanged. This demonstrated that the blood-brain barrier was broken by cerebral blood vessels, thus interfering with white matter metabolism. Another study looked at the brains of people with HACE several months after their recovery; it showed hemosiderin deposits in the corpus callosum, evidence of vascular permeability.

While there is strong evidence that vasogenic edema plays a major role in HACE, cytotoxic edema, cellular retention of fluids, may contribute as well. Cytotoxic edema may be caused by the failure of cellular ion pumps, which results from hypoxia. Then intracellular sodium and osmolarity increase, and there is an influx of water that causes cellular swelling. After the failure of the ATPase pumps, free radicals form and cause damage that complicates the edema. Evidence against cytotoxic edema includes the high levels of hypoxemia (low bloodstream oxygen) needed to cause it.

It is not known why some are more vulnerable to HACE than others. One theory is that variations in brain size play a role, but the increase in brain volume from edema does not likely cause cranial vault impingement. The presence of large sulci indicate the condition may be influenced by the brain tightly fitting. Elevated intracranial pressure is generally accepted to be a late effect of HACE. High central venous pressure may also occur late in the condition's progression.

One study demonstrated that normal autorelation of cerebral blood flow does not cause HACE. What role the sympathetic nervous system plays in determining who gets HACE is unclear, but it may have an effect.

Another theory about the cause of HACE is that hypoxia may induce nitrous oxide synthase. Vasodilation is caused by the release of nitric oxide and adenosine. This in turn can increase vascular permeability and causes edema. This may combine with low levels of cytokines to cause HACE.

== Diagnosis ==
Generally, high-altitude pulmonary edema (HAPE) or AMS precede HACE. In patients with AMS, the onset of HACE is usually indicated by vomiting, headache that does not respond to non-steroidal anti-inflammatory drugs, hallucinations, and stupor. In some situations, however, AMS progresses to HACE without these symptoms. HACE must be distinguished from conditions with similar symptoms, including stroke, intoxication, psychosis, diabetic symptoms, meningitis, or ingestion of toxic substances. It should be the first diagnosis ruled out when sickness occurs while ascending to a high altitude.

== Prevention ==
HACE is generally preventable by ascending gradually with frequent rest days while climbing or trekking. Not ascending more than 1,000 metres (3,300 ft) daily and not sleeping at a greater height than 300 metres (980 ft) more than the previous night is recommended. The risk of developing HACE is diminished if acetazolamide or dexamethasone are administered. Generally, the use of acetazolamide is preferred, but dexamethasone can be used for prevention if there are side effects or contraindications. Some individuals are more susceptible to HACE than others, and physical fitness is not preventive. Age and sex do not by themselves affect vulnerability to HACE.

== Treatment ==
Patients with HACE should be brought to lower altitudes and provided supplemental oxygen, and rapid descent is sometimes needed to prevent mortality. Early recognition is important because as the condition progresses patients are unable to descend without assistance. Dexamethasone should also be administered, although it fails to ameliorate some symptoms that can be cured by descending to a lower altitude. It can also mask symptoms, and they sometimes resume upon discontinuation. Dexamethasone's prevention of angiogenesis may explain why it treats HACE well. Three studies that examined how mice and rat brains react to hypoxia gave some credence to this idea.

If available, supplemental oxygen can be used as an adjunctive therapy, or when descent is not possible. FiO2 should be titrated to maintain arterial oxygen saturation of greater than 90%, bearing in mind that oxygen supply is often limited in high altitude clinics/environments.

In addition to oxygen therapy, a portable hyperbaric chamber (Gamow bag) can by used as a temporary measure in the treatment of HACE. These devices simulate a decrease in altitude of up to 7000 ft, but they are resource intensive and symptoms will often return after discontinuation of the device. Portable hyperbaric chambers should not be used in place of descent or evacuation to definitive care.

Diuretics may be helpful, but pose risks outside of a hospital environment. Sildenafil and tadalafil may help HACE, but there is little evidence of their efficacy. Theophylline is also theorized to help the condition.

Although AMS is not life-threatening, HACE is usually fatal within 24 hours if untreated. Without treatment, the patient will enter a coma and then die. In some cases, patients have died within a few hours, and a few have survived for two days. Descriptions of fatal cases often involve climbers who continue ascending while experiencing the condition's symptoms.

== Prognosis ==
Recovery varies between days and weeks, but most recover in a few days. After the condition is successfully treated, it is possible for climbers to reascend. Dexamethasone should be discontinued, but continual acetazolamide is recommended. In one study, it took patients between one week and one month to display a normal CT scan following HACE.

== Epidemiology ==
HACE occurs in 0.5% to 1% of people who climb or trek between 4,000 metres (13,000 ft) and 5,000 metres (16,000 ft). In some unusual cases, up to 30% of members of expeditions have had the condition. The condition is seldom seen below 3,000 metres (9,800 ft), but in some rare cases it has developed as low as 2,500 metres (8,200 ft). The condition generally does not occur until an individual has spent 48 hours at an altitude of 4,000 metres (13,000 ft).

== History ==
HACE was first described by a medical officer stationed in Chile in 1913, but few took note of it. Later, access to air travel made the condition more common because it allowed more people access to high mountains, such as those in the Himalayas. One early description of HACE may have been published in 1969 after a group of Indian soldiers made a rapid ascent to almost 6,000 metres (20,000 ft). It is not definitely established whether they had HACE or acute decompression sickness. MRI has been used to study the effects of high altitude on the brain, providing the best evidence about the condition. A 1998 MRI study of nine climbers with HACE clearly demonstrated vasogenic edema.

Data about HACE are lacking because it generally occurs in remote areas, far from hospitals and is generally rare. It is uncommon for doctors to be able to study victims within six days of the condition's development. Animal models of HACE have not been developed. Several genes are being examined for the role they may play in the development of the condition.

Increased education and helicopter capabilities have combined to cut the number of deaths from the condition. Symptoms of HACE have been reported in many cases of deaths while descending Mount Everest, although HACE may not be the only problem they experienced. HACE also posed a threat to workers on the Qinghai–Tibet Railway.

== Bibliography ==
- Bärtsch, Peter; Swenson, Erik (2013). "Acute High-Altitude Illnesses". The New England Journal of Medicine. 368 (24): 2294–302. doi:10.1056/NEJMcp1214870. PMID 23758234.
- Imray, Chris; Wright, Alex; Subudhi, Andrew; Roach, Robert (2010). "Acute Mountain Sickness: Pathophysiology, Prevention, and Treatment". Progress in Cardiovascular Diseases. 52 (6): 467–484. doi:10.1016/j.pcad.2010.02.003. PMID 20417340.
- Rosenberg, Gary (2012). Molecular Physiology and Metabolism of the Nervous System (5 ed.). Oxford University Press. ISBN 978-0-19-539427-6.
- Schoene, Robert (2008). "Illnesses at High Altitude". Chest. 134 (2): 402–16. doi:10.1378/chest.07-0561. PMID 18682459.
- Schoene, Robert; Milledge, James; Luks, Andrew; West, John (2012). High Altitude Medicine and Physiology. CRC Press. ISBN 978-1-4441-5432-0.
- Wilson, Mark; Newman, Stanton; Imray, Chris (2009). "The Cerebral Effects of Ascent to High Altitudes". Lancet Neurology. 8 (2): 175–91. doi:10.1016/S1474-4422(09)70014-6. PMID 19161909. S2CID 268646.
