= Acetazolamide =

Chemical compound

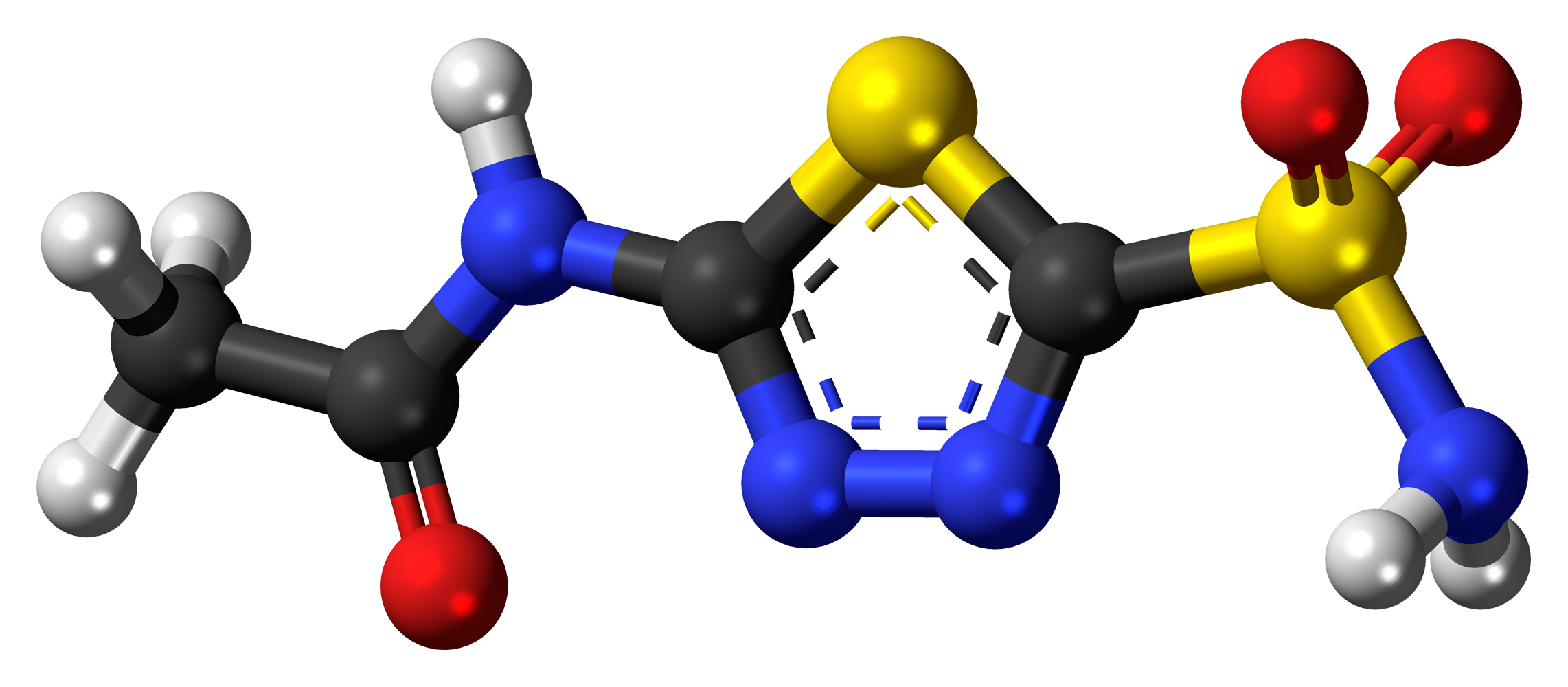

Clinical data
- Trade names: Diamox, Diacarb, others
- AHFS/Drugs.com: Monograph
- Pregnancy category: AU: B3
- Routes of administration: By mouth, intravenous
- Drug class: Carbonic anhydrase inhibitor
- ATC code: S01EC01 (WHO)

Legal status
- Legal status: AU: S4 (Prescription only); CA: ℞-only; UK: POM (Prescription only); US: ℞-only

Pharmacokinetic data
- Protein binding: 70–90%
- Metabolism: None
- Elimination half-life: 2–4 hours
- Excretion: Urine (90%)

Identifiers
- IUPAC name: N-(5-Sulfamoyl-1,3,4-thiadiazol-2-yl)acetamide
- CAS Number: 59-66-5
- PubChem CID: 1986
- IUPHAR/BPS: 6792
- DrugBank: DB00819
- ChemSpider: 1909
- UNII: O3FX965V0I
- KEGG: D00218
- ChEBI: CHEBI:27690
- ChEMBL: ChEMBL20
- PDB ligand: AZM (PDBe, RCSB PDB)
- CompTox Dashboard (EPA): DTXSID7022544
- ECHA InfoCard: 100.000.400

Chemical and physical data
- Formula: C_{4}H_{6}N_{4}O_{3}S_{2}
- Molar mass: 222.24 g·mol^{−1}
- 3D model (JSmol): Interactive image
- Melting point: 258 to 259 °C (496 to 498 °F)
- SMILES: NS(=O)(=O)c1nnc(s1)NC(=O)C
- InChI: InChI=1S/C4H6N4O3S2/c1-2(9)6-3-7-8-4(12-3)13(5,10)11/h1H3,(H2,5,10,11)(H,6,7,9); Key:BZKPWHYZMXOIDC-UHFFFAOYSA-N

Acetazolamide, sold under the trade name Diamox among others, is a medication used to treat glaucoma, epilepsy, acute mountain sickness, periodic paralysis, idiopathic intracranial hypertension (raised brain pressure of unclear cause), and heart failure, and to alkalinize urine. It may be used long term for the treatment of open angle glaucoma and short term for acute angle closure glaucoma until surgery can be carried out. It is taken by mouth or injection into a vein. Acetazolamide is a first generation carbonic anhydrase inhibitor and it decreases the ocular fluid and osmolality in the eye to decrease intraocular pressure.

Common side effects include numbness, ringing in the ears, loss of appetite, vomiting, and sleepiness. It is not recommended in those with significant kidney problems, liver problems, or who are allergic to sulfonamides. Acetazolamide is in the diuretic and carbonic anhydrase inhibitor families of medication. It works by decreasing the formation of hydrogen ions and bicarbonate from carbon dioxide and water.

Acetazolamide came into medical use in 1952. It is on the World Health Organization's List of Essential Medicines. Acetazolamide is available as a generic medication.

== Medical uses ==
It is used in the treatment of glaucoma, drug-induced edema, heart failure-induced edema, epilepsy and in reducing intraocular pressure after surgery. It has also been used in the treatment of altitude sickness, Ménière's disease, increased intracranial pressure and neuromuscular disorders. Acetazolamide is also used in the critical care setting to stimulate respiratory drive in patients with chronic obstructive pulmonary disease as an off-label indication. A 2012 review and meta-analysis found that there was "limited supporting evidence" but that acetazolamide "may be considered" for the treatment of central (as opposed to obstructive) sleep apnea.

In epilepsy, the main use of acetazolamide is in menstrual-related epilepsy and as an add on to other treatments in refractory epilepsy.

Though various websites on the internet report that acetazolamide can be used to treat dural ectasia in individuals with Marfan syndrome, the only supporting evidence for this assertion exists from a small study of 14 patients which was not peer-reviewed or submitted for publication. Several published cases of intracranial hypotension related to Marfan syndrome would warrant caution in using acetazolamide in these patients unless there is a clear indication, as it could lower intracranial pressure further.

It has also been used to prevent methotrexate-induced kidney damage by alkalinizing the urine, hence speeding up methotrexate excretion by increasing its solubility in urine. There is some evidence to support its use to prevent hemiplegic migraine.

There is tentative evidence it might improve visual snow symptoms for some.

=== High altitude sickness ===
Acetazolamide is also used for the treatment of acute mountain sickness. In the prevention or treatment of mountain sickness, acetazolamide inhibits the ability of the kidneys to reabsorb bicarbonate, the conjugate base of carbonic acid. Increasing the amount of bicarbonate excreted in the urine leads to acidification of the blood. Because the body senses CO_{2} concentration indirectly via blood pH (increase in CO_{2} causes a decrease in pH), acidifying the blood through decreased renal reabsorption of bicarbonate is sensed as an increase in CO_{2}. This, in turn, causes the body to increase minute ventilation (the amount of air breathed per minute) in order to "breathe off" CO_{2}, which in turn increases the amount of oxygen in the blood. Acetazolamide is not an immediate cure for acute mountain sickness; rather, it speeds up (or, when taking before traveling, forces the body to early start) part of the acclimatization process which in turn helps to relieve symptoms. Acetazolamide is still effective if started early in the course of mountain sickness. As prevention, it is started one day before travel to altitude and continued for the first two days at altitude.

=== Pregnancy and lactation ===
Acetazolamide is pregnancy category B3 in Australia, which means that studies in rats, mice and rabbits in which acetazolamide was given intravenously or orally caused an increased risk of fetal malformations, including defects of the limbs. Despite this, there is insufficient evidence from studies in humans to either support or discount this evidence.

Limited data are available on the effects of nursing mothers taking acetazolamide. Therapeutic doses create low levels in breast milk and are not expected to cause problems in infants.

== Side effects ==
Common adverse effects of acetazolamide include the following: paraesthesia, fatigue, drowsiness, depression, decreased libido, bitter or metallic taste, nausea, vomiting, abdominal cramps, diarrhea, black stool, polyuria, kidney stones, metabolic acidosis and electrolyte changes (hypokalemia, hyponatremia). Whereas less common adverse effects include Stevens–Johnson syndrome, anaphylaxis and blood dyscrasias.

=== Contraindications ===
Contraindications include:

- Hyperchloremic acidosis
- Hypokalemia (low blood potassium)
- Hyponatremia (low blood sodium)
- Adrenal insufficiency
- Impaired kidney function
- Hypersensitivity to acetazolamide or other sulphonamides.
- Marked liver disease or impairment of liver function, including cirrhosis because of the risk of development of hepatic encephalopathy. Acetazolamide decreases ammonia clearance.

== Interactions ==
It is possible that it might interact with:

- Amphetamines, because it increases the pH of the renal tubular urine, hence reducing the clearance of amphetamines.
- Other carbonic anhydrase inhibitors—potential for additive inhibitory effects on carbonic anhydrase and hence potential for toxicity.
- Ciclosporin, may increase plasma levels of ciclosporin.
- Antifolates such as trimethoprim, methotrexate, pemetrexed and raltitrexed.
- Hypoglycemics, acetazolamide can both increase or decrease blood glucose levels.
- Lithium, increases excretion, hence reducing therapeutic effect.
- Methenamine compounds, reduces the urinary excretion of methenamines.
- Phenytoin, reduces phenytoin excretion, hence increasing the potential for toxicity.
- Primidone, reduces plasma levels of primidone. Hence reducing anticonvulsant effect.
- Quinidine, reduces urinary excretion of quinidine, hence increasing the potential for toxicity.
- Salicylates, potential for severe toxicity.
- Sodium bicarbonate, potential for kidney stone formation.
- Anticoagulants, cardiac glycosides, may have their effects potentiated by acetazolamide.

== Mechanism of action ==
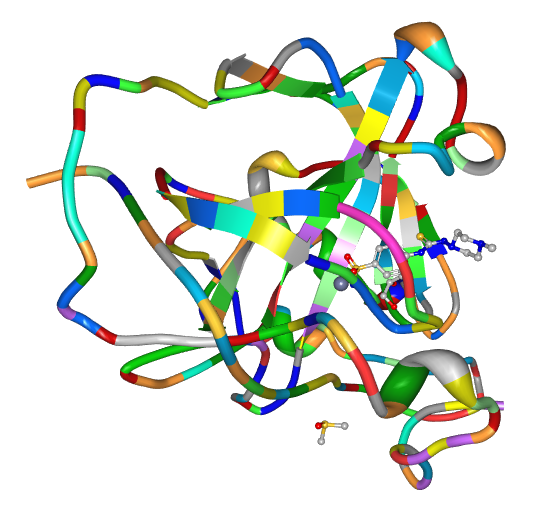
Carbonic anhydrase (ribbon) complex with a sulfonamide inhibitor (ball-and-sticks)

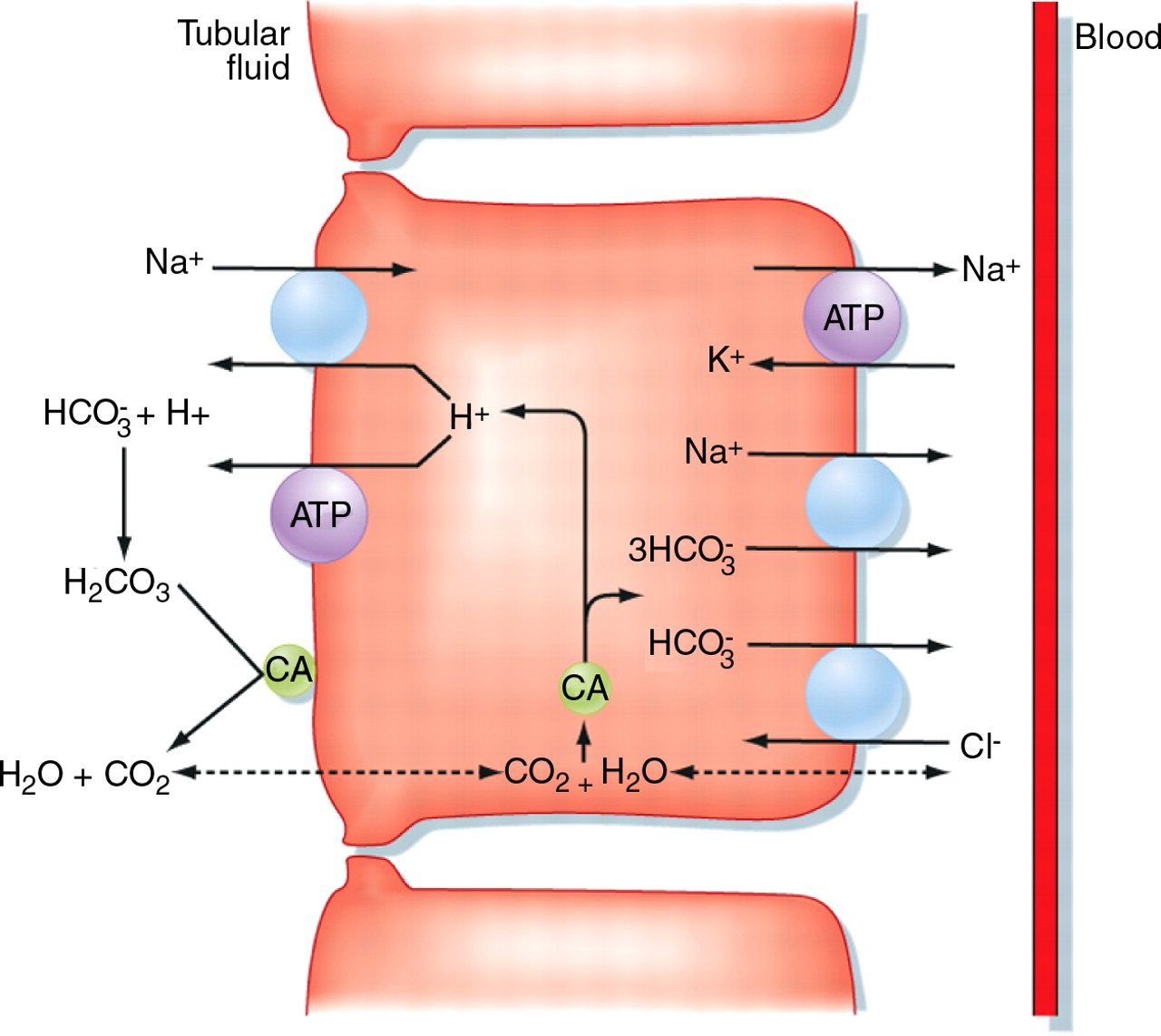
Proximal convoluted tubule. Urinary space is on left.

Acetazolamide is a carbonic anhydrase inhibitor, hence causing the accumulation of carbonic acid. Carbonic anhydrase is an enzyme found in red blood cells and many other tissues that catalyses the following reaction:

H_{2}CO_{3} ⇌ H_{2}O + CO_{2}

hence lowering blood pH, by means of the following reaction that carbonic acid undergoes:

H_{2}CO_{3} ⇌ HCO_{3}^{−} + H^{+}

which has a pK_{a} of 6.3.

The mechanism of diuresis involves the proximal tubule of the kidney. The enzyme carbonic anhydrase is found here, allowing the reabsorption of bicarbonate, sodium, and chloride. By inhibiting this enzyme, these ions are excreted, along with excess water, lowering blood pressure, intracranial pressure, and intraocular pressure. A general side effect of carbonic anhydrase inhibitors is loss of potassium due to this function. By excreting bicarbonate, the blood becomes acidic, causing compensatory hyperventilation with deep respiration (Kussmaul breathing), increasing levels of oxygen and decreasing levels of carbon dioxide in the blood.

In the eye this results in a reduction in aqueous humour.

Bicarbonate (HCO_{3}^{−}) has a pK_{a} of 10.3 with carbonate (CO_{3}^{2−}), far further from physiologic pH (7.35–7.45), and so it is more likely to accept a proton than to donate one, but it is also far less likely for it to do either, thus bicarbonate will be the major species at physiological pH.

Under normal conditions in the proximal convoluted tubule of the kidney, most of the carbonic acid (H_{2}CO_{3}) produced intracellularly by the action of carbonic anhydrase quickly dissociates in the cell to bicarbonate (HCO_{3}^{−}) and an H^{+} ion (a proton), as previously mentioned. The bicarbonate (HCO_{3}^{−}) exits at the basal portion of the cell via sodium (Na^{+}) symport and chloride (Cl^{−}) antiport and re-enters circulation, where it may accept a proton if blood pH decreases, thus acting as a weak, basic buffer. The remaining H^{+} left over from the intracellular production of carbonic acid (H_{2}CO_{3}) exits the apical (urinary lumen) portion of the cell by Na^{+} antiport, acidifying the urine. There, it may join with another bicarbonate (HCO_{3}^{−}) that dissociated from its H^{+} in the lumen of the urinary space only after exiting the proximal convoluted kidney cells/glomerulus as carbonic acid (H_{2}CO_{3}) because bicarbonate (HCO_{3}^{−}) itself can not diffuse across the cell membrane in its polar state. This will replenish carbonic acid (H_{2}CO_{3}) so that it then may be reabsorbed into the cell as itself or CO_{2} and H_{2}O (produced via a luminal carbonic anhydrase). As a result of this whole process, there is a greater net balance of H^{+} in the urinary lumen than bicarbonate (HCO_{3}^{−}), and so this space is more acidic than physiologic pH. Thus, there is an increased likelihood that any bicarbonate (HCO_{3}^{−}) that was left over in the lumen diffuses back into the cell as carbonic acid, CO_{2}, or H_{2}O.

In short, under normal conditions, the net effect of carbonic anhydrase in the urinary lumen and cells of the proximal convoluted tubule is to acidify the urine and transport bicarbonate (HCO_{3}^{−}) into the body. Another effect is excretion of Cl^{−} as it is needed to maintain electroneutrality in the lumen, as well as the reabsorption of Na^{+} into the body.

Thus, by disrupting this process with acetazolamide, urinary Na^{+} and bicarbonate (HCO_{3}^{−}) are increased, and urinary H^{+} and Cl^{−} are decreased. Inversely, serum Na^{+} and bicarbonate (HCO_{3}^{−}) are decreased, and serum H^{+} and Cl^{−} are increased. H_{2}O generally follows sodium, and so this is how the clinical diuretic effect is achieved, which reduces blood volume and thus preload on the heart to improve contractility and reduce blood pressure, or achieve other desired clinical effects of reduced blood volume such as reducing edema or intracranial pressure.

== History ==
An early description of this compound (as 2-acetylamino-1,3,4-thiadiazole-5-sulfonamide) and its synthesis has been patented in 1951.

== Research ==
Smaller clinical trials have also shown promising results in the treatment of normal pressure hydrocephalus (NPH).

== Veterinary use ==
Acetazolamide was originally used as a diuretic but has been largely supplanted by other drugs such as furosemide. Carbonic anhydrase inhibitors are no longer the preferred method of treating intraocular pressure in cases of glaucoma but when a carbonic anhydrase inhibitor is used methazolamide is preferred, although acetazolamide is still used. Acetazolamide is also used to increase the alkalinity of urine to manage urinary calculi, but requires bicarbonate supplementation. In horses it is used as a treatment for hyperkalaemic periodic paralysis.

Acetazolamide has largely been supplanted by other drugs and therapies due to side effects such as hypokalaemia and respiratory acidosis.
