= IHT =

IHT may refer to:

- International Herald Tribune newspaper
- Intermittent hypoxic training, respiratory therapy
- Inheritance tax in the United Kingdom
- Institution of Highways and Transportation, former name of UK Chartered Institution of Highways and Transportation
- IHT Records, British record label
- Institute of Health Technology, Rajshahi, Sylhet, Dhaka, Bogra, of Bangladesh
