= Northern Arizona University =

Public university in Flagstaff, Arizona, US

Coordinates: 35°11′15″N 111°39′18″W

- Former name: List: Northern Arizona Normal School (1899–1925) Northern Arizona State Teachers College (1925–1929) Arizona State Teachers College at Flagstaff (1929–1945) Arizona State College at Flagstaff (1945–1958) Arizona State College (1958–1966)
- Type: Public research university
- Established: September 11, 1899; 127 years ago
- Parent institution: Arizona Board of Regents
- Accreditation: HLC
- Academic affiliations: Space-grant
- Endowment: $218.8 million (2024)
- President: José Luis Cruz Rivera
- Provost: Karen Pugliesi
- Faculty: 1,115 (full-time)
- Students: 28,194
- Undergraduates: 23,134
- Postgraduates: 5,060
- Location: Flagstaff, Arizona, United States
- Campus: 707.62 acres (2.8636 km^{2}); Small City
- Newspaper: The Lumberjack
- Colors: Blue; Gold
- Nickname: Lumberjacks
- Sporting affiliations: NCAA Division I FCS – Big Sky; WAC
- Mascot: Louie the Lumberjack
- Website: nau.edu
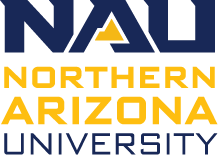

Northern Arizona University (NAU) is a public research university in Flagstaff, Arizona, United States. Founded in 1899, it was the third and final university established in the Arizona Territory. The university is divided into seven academic colleges offering about 130 undergraduate and graduate programs, and various academic certificates. Students can take classes and conduct research in Flagstaff, online, and at more than 20 statewide locations, including the Phoenix Biomedical Core research campus. As of fall 2023, 28,194 students were enrolled with 21,550 at the Flagstaff campus.

Northern Arizona University is one of the three universities governed by the Arizona Board of Regents and is accredited by the Higher Learning Commission. It is classified among "R1: Doctoral Universities – Very high research activity". NAU is ranked No. 183 in the National Science Foundation (NSF) national research rankings for fiscal year 2024. NAU's astronomy faculty led the observations of the NASA DART planetary defense mission, co-discovered several astronomical bodies such as Eris and Sedna, and are major participants in the search for the hypothetical Planet Nine. The university is a primary institution of the local Lowell Observatory.

The NAU Lumberjacks compete in the NCAA Division I primarily as part of the Big Sky Conference, and have won six national championships in cross country running. At an elevation of 6,950 ft (2,120 m) above sea level, the school's athletic facilities are used by Olympic and professional athletes worldwide for prestige high altitude training.

== History ==
=== Creation and early history ===
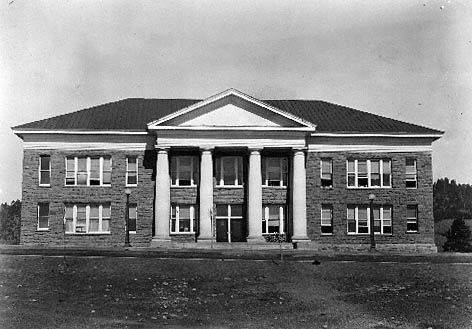
Teacher Training School (now Blome Building), 1922

Initially named the Northern Arizona Normal School, the institution opened on September 11, 1899, with 23 students, two faculty members – one, Almon Nicholas Taylor, who was also the school president – and "two copies of Webster's International Dictionary bound in sheepskin" as teaching resources. It was one of about 180 "normal schools" founded by state governments in the 19th century to train teachers for the rapidly growing public common schools. Some closed but most steadily expanded their role and became state colleges in the early 20th century and state universities in the late 20th century.

The first graduating class, in 1901, consisted of four women who received credentials to teach in the Arizona Territory. In 1925, the Arizona State Legislature allowed the school, which was then called the Northern Arizona State Teachers College (ASTC), to grant bachelor of education degrees. In 1929, the school became Arizona State Teachers College at Flagstaff. Also in 1929, the Great Depression struck the nation, and the ASTC found new meaning in community outreach. Rather than collapsing, the school endured through the depression. In fact, Grady Gammage, the school president at the time, described higher education as "a 'depression industry' that fared well in hard times." Despite financial difficulties, enrollment increased from 321 students to 535 students between 1930 and 1940, and graduate work was introduced in 1937.

ASTC provided an education during economically trying times, often creating jobs to help students afford their education; they worked in the school-owned dairy farm, in the campus kitchen and dining hall, and as newspaper deliverers. The self-sufficiency of the college helped conserve monetary resources, and it was a major contributor to the local economy of the surrounding Flagstaff community, injecting almost a half-million dollars in 1938.

ASTC was known for its diverse student body and ethnic tolerance. In fact, the first Hopi to receive a college degree was Ida Mae Fredericks in 1939. Students came from rural farms, mining families, the East Coast, and points between. During the depression, fraternities and clubs sprang up, reflecting the diversity of backgrounds and interests.

=== World War II impacts ===
During World War II, NAU was one of 131 colleges and universities nationally that took part in the V-12 Navy College Training Program which offered students a path to a Navy commission. Enrollment at the university dropped sharply at the beginning of World War II, dropping to 161 in 1945. However, the end of World War II brought increased enrollment as returning veterans continued their education.

The end of the war also expanded programs beyond teaching degrees, especially in the fields of art and science. To reflect this growth, the school changed its name to Arizona State College at Flagstaff in 1945 and, in 1958, became Arizona State College. Also in 1958, the world-renowned forestry program was started.

=== Transition to Northern Arizona University ===
With further growth over the next two decades, the Arizona Board of Regents granted Arizona State College university status as Northern Arizona University in 1966. The university received authorization to offer Doctors of Philosophy and Education in 1968, with the first doctoral candidates graduating in 1973.

In 2007, the business college was renamed The W. A. Franke College of Business, with entrepreneur Bill Franke as the namesake of the new 111,000 sq ft (10,300 m^{2}) business complex.

=== 2015 shooting ===
On October 9, 2015, Steven Edward Jones, an 18-year-old freshman at Northern Arizona University, shot four people, killing Colin Charles Brough and severely injuring three others, in a parking lot outside of Mountain View Hall on the Flagstaff Mountain campus.

Jones was charged with one count of first-degree murder and three counts of aggravated assault. He pleaded not guilty, taking responsibility for the shooting but saying that he acted in self-defense.

=== 2020s to present ===
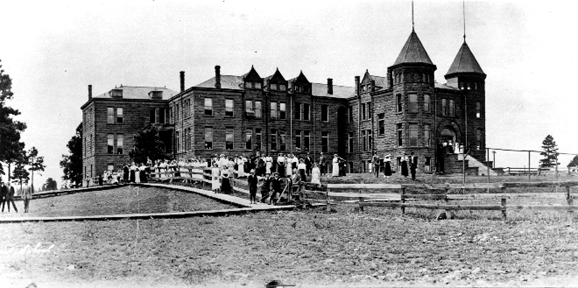
Old Main on north campus

In 2022, José Luis Cruz Rivera became the university's 17th president. In 2023, the university announced the establishment of NAU Health initiative, which will include the creation of a medical school through the College of Medicine.

== Campuses ==
=== Flagstaff campus ===
NAU Science and Health building

Set across 829 forested acres, the Flagstaff campus houses academic, administrative and residential buildings.

At 6,950 ft (2,120 m) above sea level, NAU is the fourth highest-elevation four-year college campus in the country. The main campus is surrounded by the largest contiguous ponderosa pine forest in the world and enjoys a four-season climate, with the host city of Flagstaff averaging 90.1 inches of snow per year. Winter skiing is accessible at Arizona Snowbowl, which is an alpine ski resort located on the San Francisco Peaks, 7 mi (11 km) northwest of town, and the Grand Canyon and Sedona are short drives away. Flagstaff is regularly ranked among the best college towns in the United States.

For many years, the university has prioritized sustainability initiatives, and campus-wide programs and resources encourage the entire university community to get involved with sustainability efforts. There are more than a dozen LEED (Leadership in Energy and Environmental Design)-certified buildings on campus and all new construction must meet strict LEED standards. Dining services and facilities contribute to a composting initiative, collecting more than 300,000 pounds of material each year, which prevents 250 metric tons of carbon dioxide from entering the atmosphere. Much of the campus uses renewable wind and solar technologies and the university is investigating opportunities to utilize the vast ponderosa pine forests around campus for biomass electricity or heat production. NAU President José Luis Cruz Rivera pledged carbon neutrality at NAU by 2030.

=== Statewide campuses and NAU Online ===
In addition to the more than 21,000 students who study on the Flagstaff campus, NAU currently serves another 8,000 students online and statewide. In order to provide access and affordability to all Arizona residents, NAU offers more than 130 accredited degree programs at more than 20 statewide locations. NAU also has partnerships with community colleges and NAU–Yavapai, a collaboration with Yavapai College in Prescott Valley, Arizona. The university's oldest branch campus, and the largest, is NAU–Yuma.

NAU Online offers more than 140 fully-online options at all degree levels, including undergraduate and graduate degrees, certificates, and minors.

== Academics ==
=== Colleges and programs ===
Across eight colleges (with a ninth, the College of Medicine in development), NAU offers more than 130 undergraduate degree programs, more than 80 master's degree programs, and about 20 doctoral programs, along with 50 undergraduate and 40 graduate certificates.

The top undergraduate academic degree plans by enrollment for the 2023 fall semester were:

- Psychological Sciences
- Nursing
- Biomedical Science
- Criminology and Criminal Justice
- Biology
- Elementary Education

==== College of Arts and Letters ====
The College of Arts and Letters houses numerous departments, including:

- School of Art
- Comparative Cultural Studies
- English
- Global Languages and Cultures
- History
- Philosophy
- Kitt School of Music
- Theatre

The college also oversees the Clara M. Lovett Art Museum, Martin-Springer Institute (promoting lessons of the Holocaust), Northern Arizona Writing Project, Ardrey Memorial Auditorium, and Kitt Recital Hall. The College of Arts and Letters Film Series has provided quality classic films to the NAU and Flagstaff community for a decade, and has recently established the NAU International Film Series. CAL is also home to NAU's doctoral program in Applied Linguistics. Department faculty and students share their scholarly work and artistic achievement through more than 300 performances, lectures, films, and exhibitions annually.

==== College of Education ====
The College of Education is a cornerstone of NAU academics, with bachelor's, master's, and doctoral programs available. Programs focus on early childhood, elementary, secondary, and higher education. Fields of study include:

- Educational Leadership
- Educational Psychology
- Educational Specialties (e.g., bilingual and multicultural education, career and technical education, educational technology, and special education)
- STEM Education
- Teaching and Learning

The college also houses the Diné Dual Language Teachers Professional Development Project that works with teachers with proficiency in the Diné (Navajo) language and high academic achievement to meet licensing requirements for teachers who work in language instruction education programs.

==== Steve Sanghi College of Engineering ====
The Steve Sanghi College of Engineering was named for Steve Sanghi after his $10 million donation to the college in 2024. Within Sanghi are 19 undergraduate majors, 5 minors, 13 master's, and 5 doctoral programs. The college includes schools and departments for:

- Civil and Environmental Engineering
- Construction Management
- Mechanical Engineering
- School of Informatics, Computing, and Cyber Systems

Students have access to numerous research labs including:

- Center for Ecosystem Science and Society
- Center for Health Equity Research
- Center for Materials Interfaces in Research and Applications
- Merriam Powell Center for Environmental Research
- Pathogen and Microbiome Institute

==== College of the Environment, Forestry, and Natural Sciences ====
The College of the Environment, Forestry, and Natural Sciences has undergraduate and graduate programs that integrate science and mathematics through the creative application of knowledge. Departments include:

- Astronomy and Planetary Science – This program has direct access to the Lowell Observatory, with Flagstaff being designated as one of only 22 Dark-Sky cities worldwide. NAU's astronomy faculty is notable for its contributions to astronomy, such as Cristina Thomas who led the investigations of the NASA DART planetary defense mission, and Professor Chad Trujillo who discovered several trans-Neptunian object (TNO) astronomical bodies including Eris and Sedna. The university is a major participant in research regarding the hypothetical Planet Nine.
- Biological Sciences
- Chemistry and Biochemistry
- School of Earth and Sustainability
- School of Forestry
- Mathematics and Statistics
- Applied Physics and Materials Science

More than 30 university-funded research institutes and centers are available to faculty and students, including:

- Centennial Forest
- Center for Ecosystem Science and Society
- Colorado Plateau Biodiversity Center
- Ecological Restoration Institute
- National Institute for Climate Change Research

==== College of Health and Human Services ====
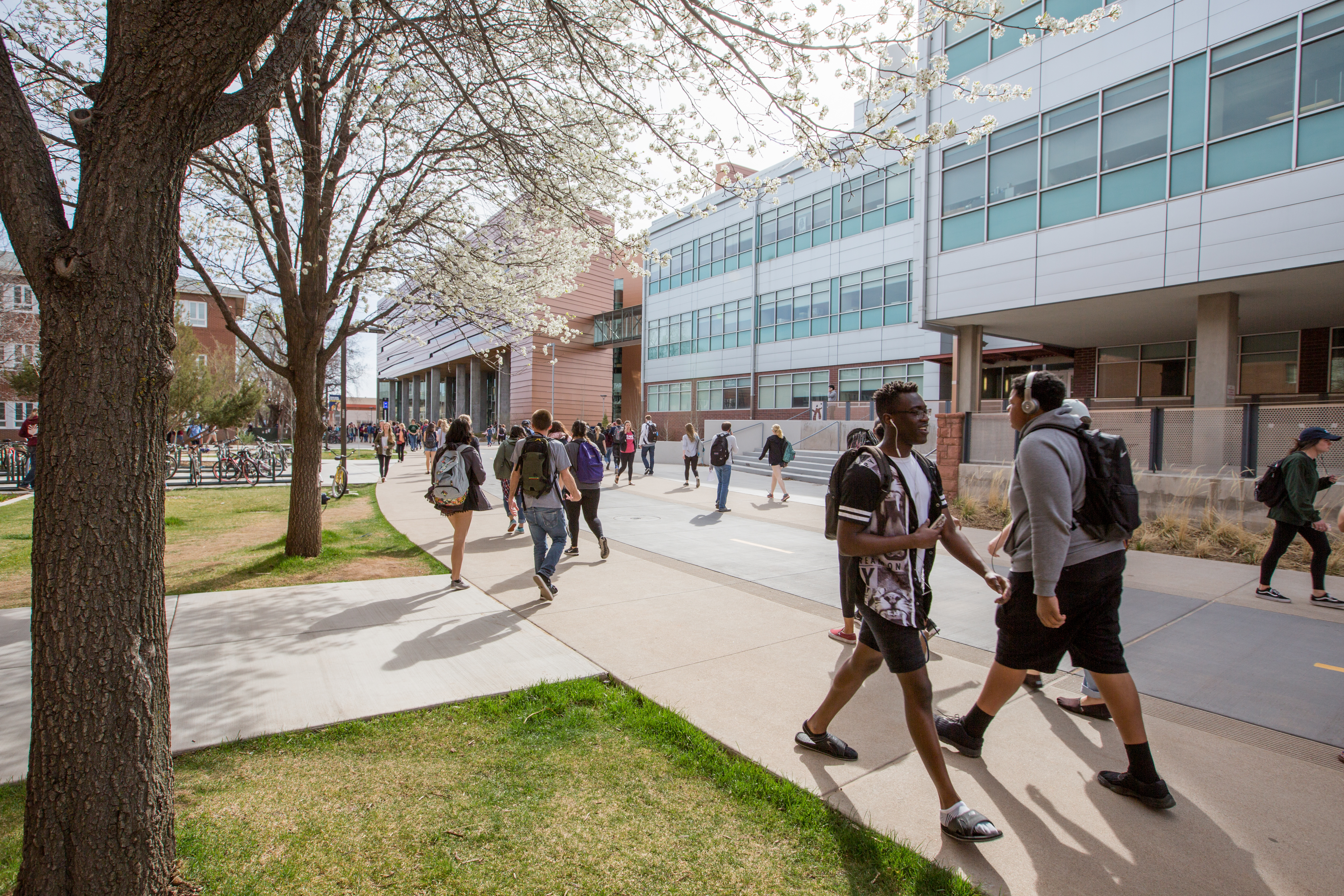
NAU Science and Health Building

The College of Health and Human Services prepares students to become excellent health professionals and to provide service to improve the health and well-being of the communities served, particularly Arizona residents, Native Americans, and individuals considered disadvantaged. The college's departments – offering bachelor's, master's, and doctoral degrees – include:

- Athletic Training
- Communication Sciences and Disorders
- Dental Hygiene
- Health Sciences
- Occupational Therapy
- Physical Therapy
- Physician Assistant Studies

The College of Health and Human Services offers several programs at the Phoenix Bioscience Core, a state-of-the-art facility on 30 acres in downtown Phoenix, Arizona that includes more than six million square feet of research, academic, and clinical facilities for students earning advanced degrees in medical professions.

==== College of Medicine ====
In 2023, the university announced the creation of the College of Medicine.

==== College of Nursing ====
In 2023, alongside the creation of the College of Medicine, the university announced the promotion of the School of Nursing to its own freestanding College.

==== College of Social and Behavioral Sciences ====
The College of Social and Behavioral Sciences offers a wide array of social science and related professional degree programs, including:

- Anthropology
- Applied Indigenous Studies
- Communication
- Criminology and Criminal Justice
- Ethnic Studies
- Geography, Planning, and Recreation
- Politics and International Affairs
- Psychological Sciences
- Social Work
- Sociology
- Sustainable Communities
- University Studies
- Women's and Gender Studies

The college also houses the Civic Service Institute that connects students, older adults, and other community members to national service volunteer opportunities within their communities. The Institute for Human Development fosters the development of attitudes that promote the public's appreciation and value of individuals with disabilities.

==== W.A. Franke College of Business ====
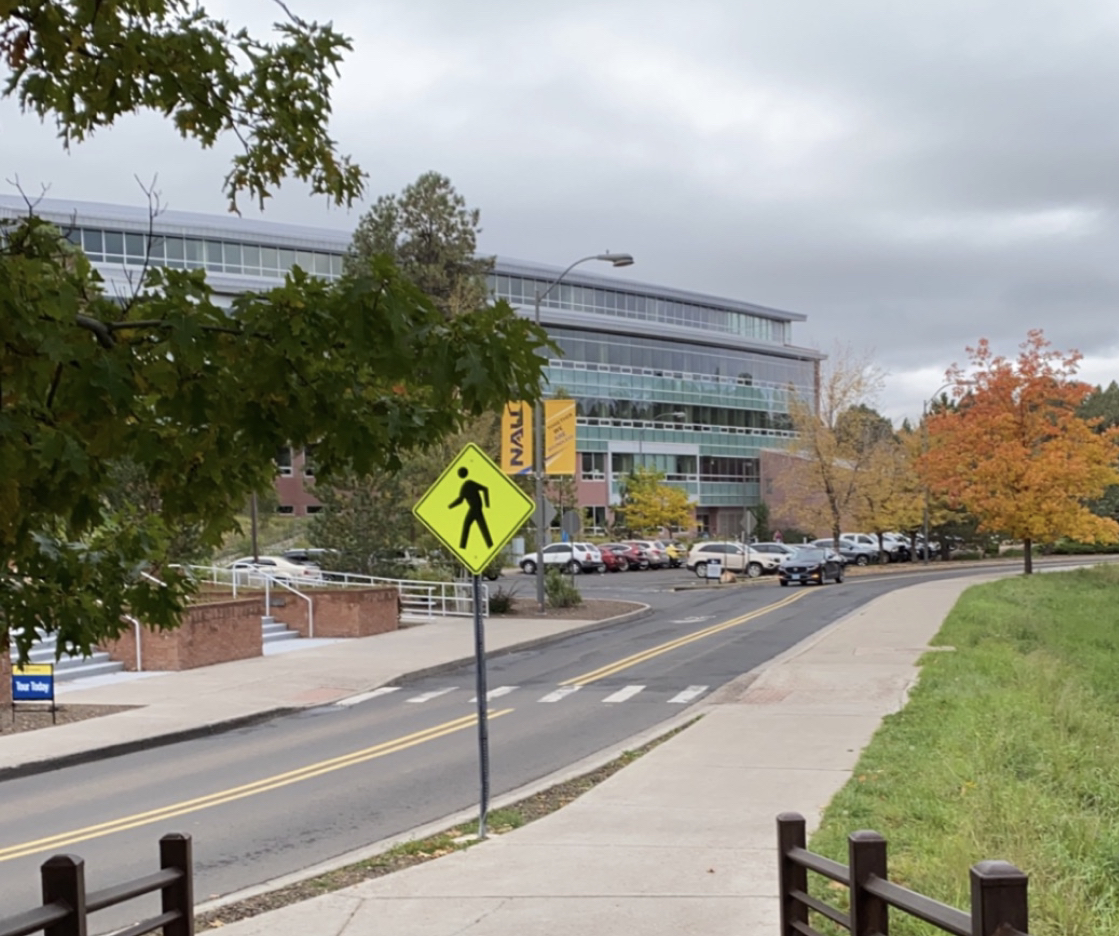
W.A. Franke College of Business

The W. A. Franke College of Business (FCB) offers degrees at the undergraduate and master's levels. Airline entrepreneur Bill Franke commitment of $25 million resulted in the renaming of the college in his honor in 2007. It is accredited by the Association to Advance Collegiate Schools of Business – AACSB International. The FCB offers seven undergraduate BSBA degrees for Accounting, Economics, Finance, Hospitality (HRM), Information Systems, Management, and Marketing, which students complete through the Business Professional Program (BPP). The college also offers 13 business certification programs and Master of Business Administration (MBA) program for graduate students.

The Franke building is an open-floor four-level 111,000 sq ft (10,300 m^{2}) complex with a grand central staircase, auditoriums, 14 classrooms, five computer labs, 11 student conference rooms, several lounges, 56 administrative offices, exterior porches, and a café. The Career Development Office and Business Communication Center is located in the building. The building architecturally received LEED-Gold certifications for its environmentally friendly design.

===== School of Hotel and Restaurant Management (HRM) =====
The W.A. Franke College of Business operates the School of Hotel and Restaurant Management (HRM), which offers two Bachelor of Science degrees in Hotel and Restaurant Management and Interdisciplinary Studies in Hospitality Management, along with 6 hospitality certifications. The school is located at the Eugene M. Hughes Complex at the northern part of the NAU campus, named after former university president Eugene Hughes. The building features a high-tech demonstration kitchen, mock lobbies, conference rooms, and cafés.

The School of Hotel and Restaurant Management has been consistently been ranked among the best hospitality programs in North America.

==== Honors College ====
NAU is home to the first Honors program offered in Arizona. The academic enrichment program is open to students of all majors and offers coursework, research opportunities, and programs designed to enhance the undergraduate experience. Honors College students have unique opportunities for study abroad and can participate in out-of-classroom programs like the Grand Canyon Semester. First-year Honors students can live in the Honors Hall, which offers living, learning, and study spaces under the same roof.

==== Graduate College ====
The Graduate College offers more than 80 master's degrees, about 20 doctoral degrees, and 40 graduate certificates, both in-person and online. NAU offers graduate students hands-on mentoring, and numerous research, scholarship, and creative activities. The NAU Graduate College supports all aspects of graduate education and provides professional development opportunities for students.

Top graduate programs for fall 2023 were:

- Computer Information Technology
- Computer Science
- Physical Therapy – Entry Level
- Organizational Leadership
- Business Administration
- Clinical Psychology

=== Research ===
Northern Arizona University is ranked No. 178 in the most recent National Science Foundation (NSF) national research rankings for fiscal year 2021 performance of $69.1 million. The research division's core facilities are the Environmental Genetics and Genomics Resource Center, Imaging and Histology Core Facility, and the Research Greenhouse Complex. Other research laboratories include the Centennial Forest, Child Speech and Language Lab, Colorado Plateau Analytical Lab, Geospatial Research and Information Laboratory, Laboratory for Applied Social Research, Merriam-Powell Research Station, RAPIDLab, Southwest Experimental Garden Array, and Walnut Creek Center for Education and Research. The Pathogen and Microbiome Institute conducts research to track and fight a host of rapidly evolving and potentially deadly diseases including COVID-19. More than 100 faculty, full-time staff, graduate and undergraduate students work in the institute. Collections, archives and museums include The Arboretum at Flagstaff, Art Museum, Cline Library Special Collections and Archives, Colorado Plateau Biodiversity Center, and the Museum of Northern Arizona.

Northern Arizona University joined the Lowell Discovery Telescope partner group in 2014. NAU scientists use the LDT for deep imaging of small objects in the Solar System. Additionally, NAU partners with Lowell at its Anderson Mesa site, both in the National Undergraduate Research Laboratory and in a new Near-Earth Object follow-up program. NAU also manages the National Undergraduate Research Observatory, which provides access to Lowell's 0.79-meter telescope for a consortium of four-year colleges around the country.

=== Rankings ===
Academic rankings

National
- Forbes: 297
- U.S. News & World Report: 244
- Washington Monthly: 155
- WSJ/College Pulse: 501–600

Global
- ARWU: 501–600
- QS: 1201–1400
- THE: 501–600
- U.S. News & World Report: 519

The Times Higher Education World University Rankings for 2021–2022 ranked NAU 501st–600th both internationally and nationally.

In 2024, Washington Monthly ranked NAU 155th among 438 national universities in the U.S. based on NAU's contribution to the public good, as measured by social mobility, research, and promoting public service.

Forbes ranked NAU 297th out of the top 500 rated private and public colleges and universities in America for the 2024–25 report. NAU was also ranked 198th among public colleges and 72nd in the west.

=== Admissions ===
In February 2022, NAU announced the Access2Excellence admissions pilot program. The goal is to increase Arizona high school students' access to college. Previously, NAU, like Arizona State University and the University of Arizona, required 16 core courses for assured admissions. However, not all Arizona high schools offer the 16 core courses, especially in second languages and math. NAU's pilot program removed the second language course availability barrier and will accept more fourth-year math courses, allowing more students the opportunity to pursue a postsecondary education.

Fall first-year student statistics

	2023	2022	2021	2020	2019	2018	2017	2016	2015
Applicants	37,805	44,855	42,872	37,386	36,855	36,831	36,875	36,511	31,995
Admits	34,383	35,881	33,592	30,523	31,312	30,428	29,812	28,495	20,727
% admitted	90.94	79.99	78.35	81.60	84.95	82.61	80.85	78.04	64.78
Enrolled	5,473	5,575	5,297	5,217	3,395	3,668	3,872	5,607	3,872
Avg freshman GPA	3.70	3.70	3.70	3.70	3.64	3.61	3.60	3.60	3.40
Avg ACT composite	22	22	22	22	23	23	23	23	23

== Tuition and fees ==
The average cost of tuition and fees for a full-time, Arizona resident undergraduate student for the 2023–24 school year is $12,652 and $28,900 for out-of-state undergraduates. NAU also participates in the Western Undergraduate Exchange Program, which offers lower tuition rates for students from the Western United States. For 2023–24, WUE tuition and fees are $18,328. NAU is also part of two programs, the Western Regional Graduate program and the Professional Student Exchange Program, that allow approved graduate students from other Western states to pay in-state tuition.

NAU's Access2Excellence (A2E) initiative, announced in April 2022 by President José Luis Cruz Rivera, will provide a tuition-free undergraduate college education for every Arizona resident with a household income of $65,000 or below, assuring tuition will be fully covered by scholarships and financial aid. A2E also covers the cost of tuition for members of 22 federally recognized Arizona tribes, regardless of income or residency. Approximately 50 percent of Arizona households currently meet this financial threshold.

== Native American initiatives ==
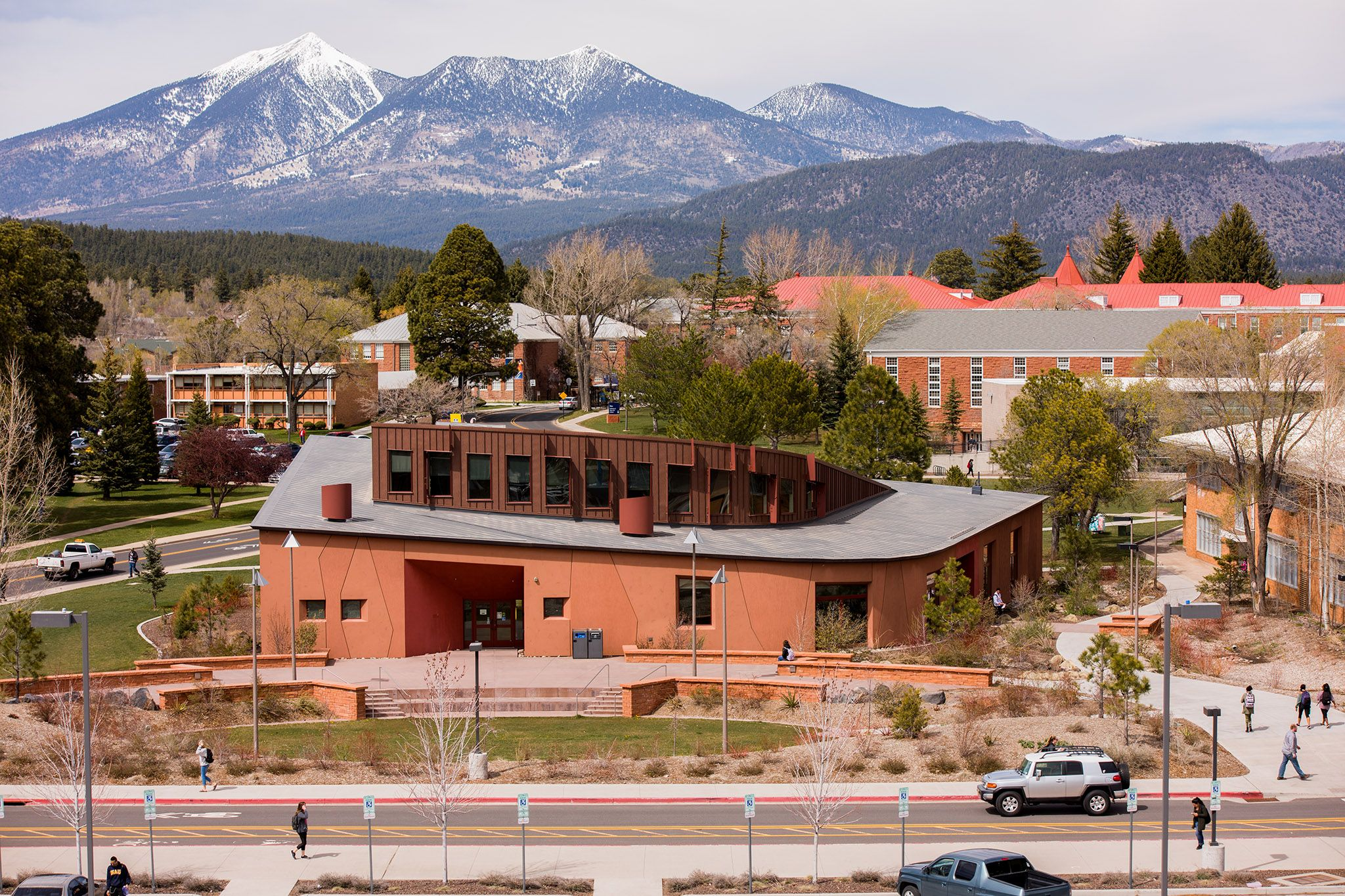
The Native American Cultural Center is a campus hub for the NAU Indigenous community.

Part of the NAU 2025 Elevating Excellence strategic roadmap is to be "the nation's leading university serving Indigenous Peoples." Many programs on and off campus have been established in support of this goal.

The Native American Cultural Center is a 12,000-square-foot facility that houses many programs built to support Indigenous students and functions as a social and cultural hub. The Office of Native American Initiatives supports students and Indigenous communities with programs including the Institute for Native-serving Educators, the Institute for Tribal Environmental Professionals, the Tribal Leadership Initiative, and the Office of Indigenous Student Success.

== Martin-Springer Institute ==
The Martin-Springer Institute was founded at NAU in 2000 to "raise awareness of human rights through Holocaust remembrance and education." The institute was founded by Holocaust survivor Doris Martin and her husband Ralph Martin. The institute, headed by Director Björn Krondorfer, hosts speakers, academic workshops, and symposia; mounts public exhibitions; funds research; and provides educational workshops and study tours for Arizona teachers.

== Residence halls ==
NAU houses nearly 10,500 students on campus.

=== First-year residence halls ===
Available freshman halls include Allen Hall, Campbell Hall, Cowden Hall, Honors College, McConnell Hall, Morton Hall, Reilly Hall, Sechrist Hall (a nine-story residence hall, the tallest building in northern Arizona), Taylor Hall, Tinsley Hall, and Wilson Hall.

=== Upper-division housing ===
Upper-division suite-style and apartment housing is available to sophomores, juniors, and seniors.

On-campus housing for upper-division students includes:

Calderón, Campus Heights, Gabaldon, Gillenwater, McDonald, McKay Village, Mountain View, Pine Ridge Village, Raymond, Roseberry, and South Village.

Residents of family units are within the Flagstaff Unified School District. Residents are zoned to Kinsey Elementary School, Mount Elden Middle School, and Flagstaff High School.

=== NAU partner housing by American Campus Communities ===
Rising juniors and seniors currently living on campus have priority leasing status for university-partnered housing located on campus. These halls are located on the NAU campus, but are operated by American Campus Communities: The Suites, Hilltop Townhomes, and Skyview.

== Athletics ==
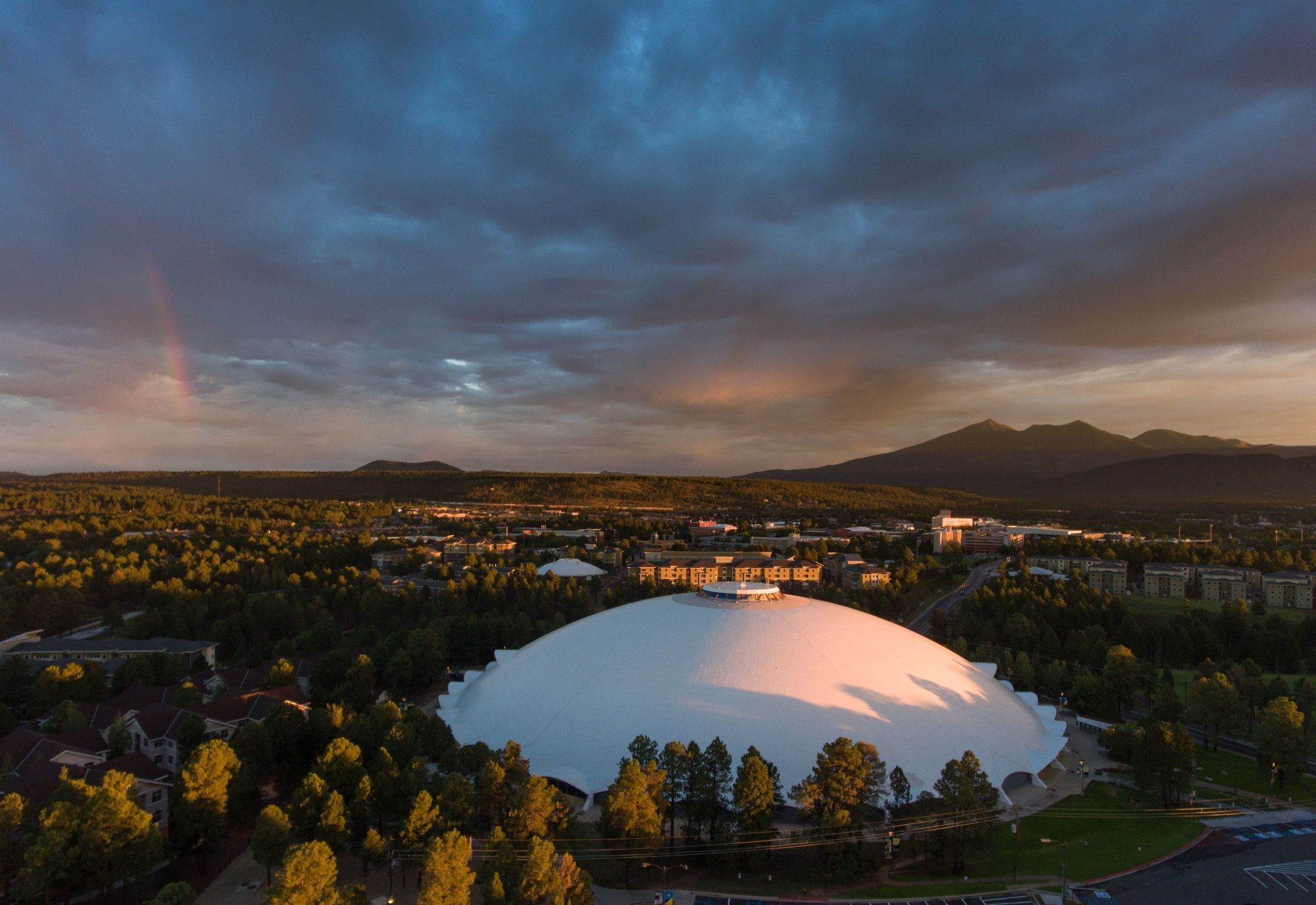
Walkup Skydome on the north campus

Student-athletes compete at the intervarsity level in football (men); volleyball, soccer, golf, and swimming and diving (women); and basketball, cross country, indoor and outdoor track and field, and tennis (men and women). The university participates in 15 intercollegiate sports programs. Several of NAU's teams compete at the Walkup Skydome, a multipurpose stadium providing facilities for football, basketball, indoor track and field, soccer, weight lifting, lacrosse, student recreation, major concert events, commencements, intramurals, and a variety of other university and community activities.

The $47 million, 77,000 square-foot Student-Athlete High Performance Center opened in February 2022. The facility includes a 10,000-square-foot weight room, an academic center, basketball courts, an adjacent practice field, locker rooms, team meeting rooms, an auditorium, and sports-medicine spaces. The Rolle Activity Center provides physical education classrooms and contains courts for recreational and varsity sports, including NAU's volleyball team, with seating for almost 1,100. The building was named after Joseph C. Rolle, "Mr. Lumberjack", in 1989. Rolle played basketball from 1937 to 1941, served as student body president, and received a BA in 1941 and MA in education in 1950 from Arizona State College of Flagstaff. He later earned an EdS from Columbia University and then worked at NAU for 36 years in positions ranging from bookstore manager to dean of students and dean of university services.

The Wall Aquatic Center in the Aquatic and Tennis Complex is one of the finest high-altitude swimming facilities in the world.

The Lumberjacks compete at the NCAA Division I level in all sports. In football, the Lumberjacks compete at the Football Championship Subdivision level (formerly known as Division I-AA). NAU competes in the Big Sky Conference in all sports except swimming and diving, which are part of the Western Athletic Conference.

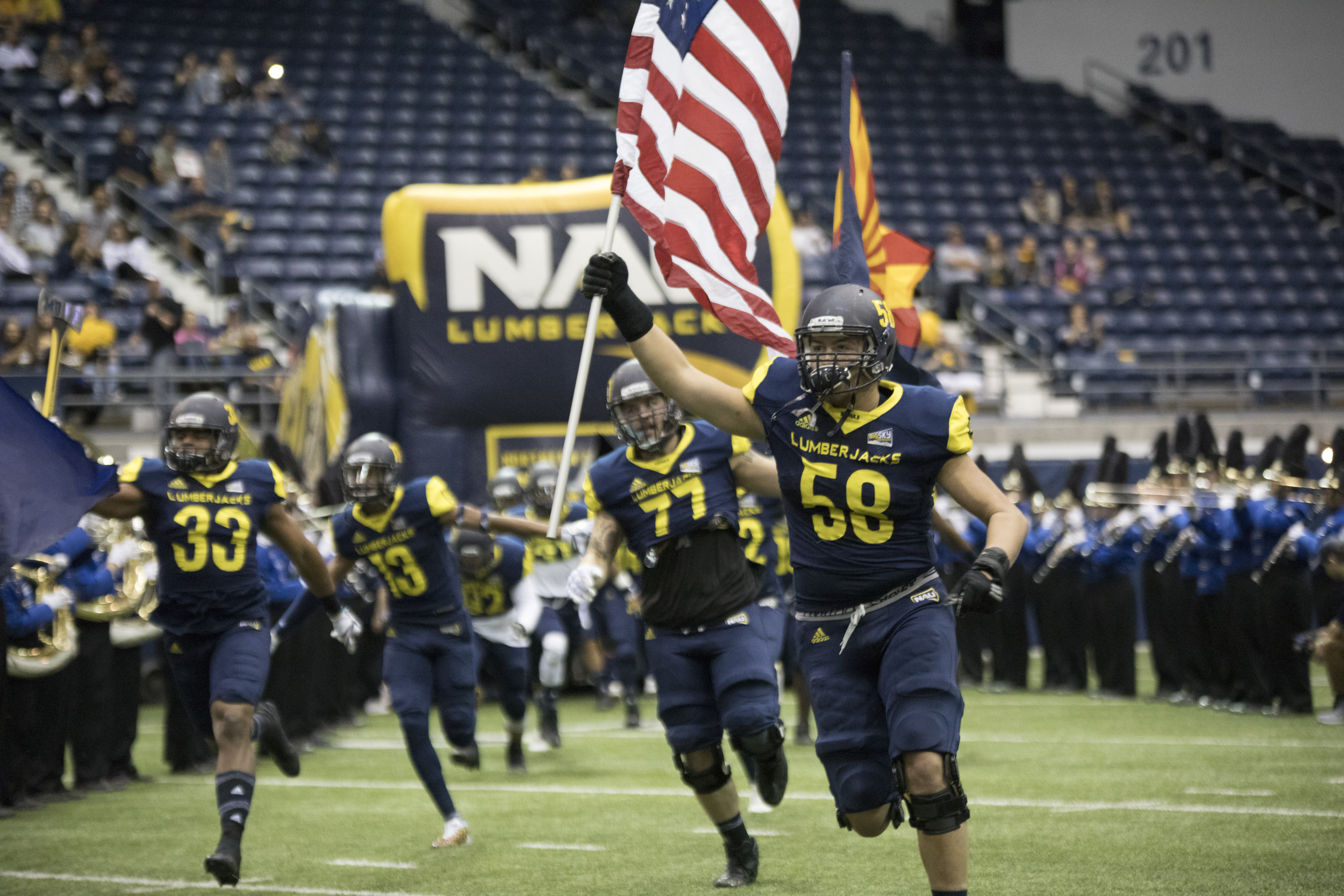
Football players at NAU

The Lumberjacks won the NCAA Men's Division I Cross Country Championship in 2016, 2017, 2018, 2020, 2021, and 2022. The 2017 repeat title closed out a perfect season with a 53-point victory, placing five athletes in the top 40. The victory was the lowest score (74) at the NCAA Championships since 2014, and the Lumberjacks became the first repeat champions since 2013–14. Director of Cross Country and Track and Field Michael Smith earned the Bill Dellinger Award as National Men's Coach of the Year and also picked up both the Big Sky's Men's and Women's Coach of the Year awards. In track and field, Smith was named the US Track & Field and Cross Country Coaches Association (USTFCCCA) Mountain Region Women's Indoor Coach of the Year in 2017 and 2018.

Maya Calé-Benzoor of Israel set the school outdoor long jump record at 20 ft 6 in (6.25 m), NAU records in both the women's indoor and outdoor long (20' 6".00) and triple jumps (41' 3".75), and 40' 5".00 in the indoor triple jump. She was an NCAA All American in 1984. In 1989 she was inducted into the NAU Athletic Hall of Fame.

Because of its high elevation, NAU's facilities are sometimes used for altitude training by endurance athletes.

== Student body and on-campus activities ==
Undergraduate demographics as of Fall 2023
Race and ethnicity	Total
White	54%
Hispanic	27%
Two or more races	6%
Asian	4%
American Indian and Alaska Native	3%
Black	3%
International student	2%
Unknown	1%
Economic diversity
Low-income (Note: The percentage of students who received an income-based federal Pell grant intended for low-income students.)	31%
Affluent (Note: The percentage of students who are a part of the American middle class at the bare minimum.)	69%

=== Organizations ===
NAU has more than 400 recognized professional, academic, service, and social organizations; an intramural sports program; The Lumberjack student newspaper; and active residence hall organizations.

=== Advanced Media Lab ===
The 2,000-square-foot lab offers undergraduate and graduate students opportunities to collaborate with scholars and researchers on grant-funded projects including mobile development, augmented and virtual reality, filmmaking, aerial drone cinematography, motion capture, and eSports.

=== Student-run media ===
In the Social and Behavioral Sciences' School of Communication, the Media Innovation Center (MIC) hosts several immersive learning programs where students practice journalism and filmmaking in real-world settings.

==== The Lumberjack ====
Students can work at The Lumberjack, covering news of NAU and the region for Jackcentral.com and social media, and a print edition circulated throughout Flagstaff. The student-run newspaper is more than a century old and has numerous journalism awards to its credit.

The MIC sports team is a multimedia organization allowing students to cover sports across Arizona for TV, online, social media, and print.

==== NAZ Today, KJACK Radio, UTV Studios ====
Through UTV Studios, students produce short films and two student film festivals during each academic year. UTV 62, a student-run cable channel, operates 24 hours daily, seven days a week on campus channel 62.

Students also produce NAZ Today, which is broadcast on cable television throughout northern Arizona. It is the only local newscast in the region. In 2018, NAZ Today received national recognition from the Broadcast Education Association for "best student television newscast produced more than four days weekly." Students in NAU's Strategic Communication program publish NAZ Today stories on Facebook and Twitter, and maintain the show's website.

KJACK (KLJXLP, 107.1 FM) is an FCC-licensed radio station that gives students hands-on learning of the basics of radio and broadcasting. In addition to popular and alternative music, KJACK students provide live sports broadcasts, talk shows, and news.

NAU's televised news program, NAZ Today, airs Monday through Thursday in Flagstaff on NPG cable channel 4; formerly, it also aired on UniversityHouse (Dish Network channel 9411) until it folded. Since the shutdown of Channel 2 news in August 2008, NAZ Today is now the only TV news source for the Flagstaff area.

Members of the MIC sports team cover sports across Northern Arizona for various media platforms in the MIC. Students also cover Baseball Spring Training and other major sporting events in Phoenix.

=== Recreation services ===
The John Haeger Health and Learning Center features include an indoor jogging track, a 38-foot climbing wall, a large weight room, a multipurpose gym, a cardio theatre, and 123,000 square feet of recreation opportunities. The center also includes all of the on-campus medical services and the offices for Disability Resources on campus.

=== Intramural and club sports ===
More than 30 competitive and recreational intramural opportunities in individual and team sports are available. Also, more than 40 sports clubs are classified as either competitive or recreational/instructional, including baseball, rugby, soccer, ice hockey, lacrosse, Quidditch, disc golf, kendo, mixed martial arts, and water polo. The club tennis team competes in the national USTA Tennis on Campus league and won the national Spring Invitational in 2017.

=== Lumberjack Marching Band ===
Supported by the Kitt School of Music, the Northern Arizona University's Lumberjack Marching Band performs at all home football games and select away games amongst other athletic events. The Lumberjack Band was invited to perform in the 2025 Macy's Thanksgiving Day Parade.

=== Movies and other events ===
Unions and Student Activities offers many services and events for the campus community, such as movies and the popular Friday night AfterHours program produced by Sun Entertainment. SUN also presents concerts, comedians, free movies, trivia nights, dodgeball, and many other special events each year. The College of Arts and Letters presents classic films every Tuesday night during the school year, and more than 400 music and theatrical performances, lectures, films, and art exhibitions annually.

== Alumni ==
The NAU Alumni Association represents more than 160,000 alumni, including two governors of Arizona, one U.S. senator, one U.S. representative, two U.S. ambassadors, one Medal of Honor recipient, and 16 Olympians. Graduates also include four Truman Scholars, 11 Goldwater Scholars, and three Udall Scholars.

== Professional sports ==
The Arizona Cardinals of the NFL conducted their summer training camp at Northern Arizona University's Flagstaff campus for many years until 2013. The Cardinals left Flagstaff to conduct their camp in Glendale in 2013. Beginning in 2014, NAU entered into partnerships with the Phoenix Suns and the Phoenix Mercury of the NBA and WNBA, respectively.

== See also ==
- List of forestry universities and colleges
