= Markus Torgeby =

Swedish runner

- Born: 1976 (age 49–50); Sweden
- Occupations: Runner, author
- Known for: Four years of solitary living and running in the forests of Jämtland
- Notable work: The Runner: Four Years Living and Running in the Wilderness (2015); Under the Open Skies (2020)

Markus Torgeby (born 1976) is a Swedish runner and author. His foot was injured during a high-altitude training and triggered a life crisis. Later, he took four years of self-selected solitude life in a hut in the forests of Jämtland, Northern Sweden. He has published two books: The Runner: Four Years Living and Running in the Wilderness (2015), and Under the Open Skies (2020).
