= Junior tennis =

Tennis matches between players 18 and under

Junior tennis refers to tennis matches where the participants are aged 18 and under. Eligibility to compete in International Tennis Federation Junior tournaments is not based on age, but year of birth: as a result, some players must move out of juniors soon after their 18th birthday, while others can play juniors until they are nearly 19. Some players who qualify as "junior tennis" players also play in main adult tours, though forms signed by their parent or guardian are required for this. Historically, some junior players will turn professional at the age of 16 like Andre Agassi or Pete Sampras.

== United States Tennis Association (USTA) Junior Tournaments ==
The USTA runs their own circuit of junior tournaments at sorted into different age groups. With initial junior tournaments being organized in the 1910s, the USTA now runs a yearly circuit of tournaments ranging from district level up to national and international events. The USTA offers tournaments for divisions as young as 8 and under, up to 18 and under. For the younger divisions, smaller courts and shortened matches are used, transitioning into full best of three sets matches at the older age divisions. Many participants in the USTA junior circuit go on to play tennis in college, either at the collegiate level, or through the USTA Tennis on Campus. Until recently, each region of the USTA operated under slightly different formats, rules and regulations. But as of 2021, the USTA has standardized their ranking system and tournaments system under a single set of guidelines.

=== Eligibility ===
To play a USTA sanctioned tournament, a junior must be a registered USTA member and a US citizen. Some non-US citizens are also allowed to compete, such as those living in the US for asylum or with refugee status, or children of diplomats. In addition, a player is allowed to compete in an age division until the month of their birthday in which they age-out (such as turning 17 and no longer being 16 and under). Players often compete in multiple divisions, playing above their age in addition to their current age division. All USTA members are divided by location into sections, with some junior tournaments restricting entry only to players in the section they are held.

=== Tournaments ===
The USTA separates their junior tournaments into 7 levels, with the highest leveled tournaments being Level 1, and then descending in ranking points available and prestige until Level 7. Level 1 and Level 2 tournaments are exclusively run at the national level (some notable tournaments include the USTA National Championships, which funnels into the Junior US Open and US Open for the 16s and 18s divisions respectively). Level 3 tournaments are run both at the national, and the sectional level, where some sections can run "Closed Section Level 3 Tournaments", where they restrict entry to be exclusively players from that section. Each USTA section hosts an annual Sectionals Championship, a Level 3 tournament that provides the winner direct entry into the USTA National Championships at the corresponding age level. All tournaments below Level 3 are hosted at the sectional or district level, and usually provide fewer points. These tournaments can vary between being closed section or open to any USTA junior, which is decided by the section running them. Each tournament level has its own formatting rules and draw sizes, but most matches played are best two out of three sets, with either a full third set or a tiebreak played in lieu of a third set. The larger tournaments are often 64 or 128 players per draw, while smaller tournaments can have as few as 2 or 4 players.

The USTA Tournament System
| Tournament Level | Points For Winning | Regional Level | Example |
|---|---|---|---|
| Level 1 | 3000 | National | USTA National Championships, USTA Boys’ 18 National Team Championships |
| Level 2 | 1650 | National | USTA Boys’ and Girls’ 16, 14, and 12 Zone Team Championships |
| Level 3 | 900 | Sectional / National | USTA Sectional Championships |
| Level 4 | 540 | Sectional | Closed Intrasectional Level 4 Team Tournaments |
| Level 5 | 300 | District / Sectional | |
| Level 6 | 120 | District / Sectional | |
| Level 7 | 32 | District / Sectional | |

=== Ranking ===
Players are accepted into tournaments based on their USTA ranking. Before 2021, rankings were calculated at both the sectional and the national level, with different point tallies for the different categories. However, the USTA has since standardized their ranking system, removing the sectional ranking systems, leaving only the national rankings. A player's singles ranking is calculated by summing the points received from their best 6 singles results in the last 12 months, as well as 15% of the points received for their 6 best doubles results. The USTA posts summarized rankings multiple times a year, but uses a weekly standings list to determine entry into tournaments. They also provide point rewards for certain international tournaments, such as the Junior Grand Slams.

Top ranked USTA juniors often go on to professional play, or top ranked Division I college programs. Recent notable former USTA junior players include Francis Tiafoe, John Isner, Sloane Stephens and Madison Keys.

== The ITF junior tour ==
The International Tennis Federation conducts the ITF Junior Circuit, which allows juniors to establish a world junior ranking and give them a chance to get an ATP or WTA ranking. Most juniors who enter the international circuit have to do so by progressing through ITF tournaments, Satellites, Futures and Challenger tournaments before entering the main circuit, the latter three of which are also participated in by adults. However, some juniors, such as Australian Lleyton Hewitt and Frenchman Gaël Monfils, have catapulted directly from the junior tour to the ATP tour by dominating the junior scene or by taking advantage of opportunities given to them to participate in professional tournaments.

=== Tournament grades ===
Tournaments are divided into 8 different grades. The following list presents them in descending order of importance towards the junior ranking.

- Grade A (including four Grand Slams)
- Grade B (Regional Championships)
- Grade C (International Team Competitions)
- Grades 1–5

=== Rankings ===
In 2004, the ITF implemented a new rankings scheme to encourage greater participation in doubles, by combining two rankings (singles and doubles) into one combined tally. Junior tournaments do not offer prize money. Juniors may earn income through tennis by participating on the Futures, Satellites or Challenger tours. Tournaments are broken up into different tiers offering different amounts of ranking points, culminating with Grade A and the junior Grand Slams - the most prestigious junior events. Worldwide, many junior players also have a Universal Tennis Rating.

=== Year-end number one players ===
| Year | Boys | Girls |
|---|---|---|
| 2004 | (France) Gaël Monfils | (Netherlands) Michaëlla Krajicek |
| 2005 | (United States) Donald Young | (Belarus) Victoria Azarenka |
| 2006 | (Netherlands) Thiemo de Bakker | (Russia) Anastasia Pavlyuchenkova |
| 2007 | (Lithuania) Ričardas Berankis | (Poland) Urszula Radwańska |
| 2008 | (Chinese Taipei) Yang Tsung-hua | (Thailand) Noppawan Lertcheewakarn |
| 2009 | (Sweden) Daniel Berta | (France) Kristina Mladenovic |
| 2010 | (Colombia) Juan Sebastián Gómez | (Russia) Daria Gavrilova |
| 2011 | (Czech Republic) Jiří Veselý | (Russia) Irina Khromacheva |
| 2012 | (Canada) Filip Peliwo | (United States) Taylor Townsend |
| 2013 | (Germany) Alexander Zverev | (Switzerland) Belinda Bencic |
| 2014 | (Russia) Andrey Rublev | (United States) Catherine Bellis |
| 2015 | (United States) Taylor Fritz | (Hungary) Dalma Gálfi |
| 2016 | (Serbia) Miomir Kecmanović | (Russia) Anastasia Potapova |
| 2017 | (Argentina) Axel Geller | (United States) Whitney Osuigwe |
| 2018 | (Chinese Taipei) Tseng Chun-hsin | (France) Clara Burel |
| 2019 | (Argentina) Thiago Agustín Tirante | (France) Diane Parry |
| 2020 | No ranking due to COVID-19 | |
| 2021 | (China) Juncheng Shang | (Croatia) Petra Marčinko |
| 2022 | (Belgium) Gilles-Arnaud Bailly | (Czech Republic) Lucie Havlíčková |
| 2023 | (Brazil) João Fonseca | (Russia) Alina Korneeva |
| 2024 | (Norway) Nicolai Budkov Kjær | (Australia) Emerson Jones |

=== Grand Slam and Grade A tournaments ===
The grand slam tournaments are the same for juniors as they are for the professional seniors, the Australian Open, French Open, Wimbledon, and the US Open. In addition, there are five other prestigious junior tournaments, given Grade A status by the ITF. They are, in calendar order, the Abierto Juvenil Mexicano, Copa Gerdau, Trofeo Bonfiglio, Osaka Mayor's Cup, and the Orange Bowl.

=== International team tournaments ===
The ITF has developed international junior tournaments; the boys tournament is named the "Junior Davis Cup by BNP Paribas", and the tournament for girls is named the "Junior Fed Cup".
