= Hypoxic Training Index =

The Hypoxic Training index (HTi) provides an objective measure of the hypoxic stress delivered during the Intermittent Hypoxic Training (IHT) session, compared to simple recording the inhaled fraction of oxygen (FiO2). HTi provides a figure (index) of dosage received by the individual at the end of the session. Knowledge of HTi can therefore be used to alter the training regime for different individuals, compensating for individual variability, and can be used in scientific studies to ensure that subject exposure was correctly controlled.

Tissue hypoxia develops only when arterial oxygen saturation (SpO2) drops to 90% or below. This is due to the oxyhaemoglobin dissociation curve. Saturations above 90% produce very little effect or decrease of arterial oxygen partial pressure (PaO2). In order to obtain consistent and comparable values of HTi for different individuals the following conditions should be stipulated:

- The values of SpO2 above 89% are not considered in the calculation of HTi, as such saturation levels do not contribute to the treatment. SpO2 values below 75% count as 75%.
- HTi is calculated as an integral value of SpO2 readings made with 1 s sampling frequency and divided by 60 in order to produce a “per minute” value.
- During the treatment target SpO2 values are in the range of 75% - 89%.

== Calculation ==
The resulting formula for calculating HTi is:

$HTi = \frac {1}{60} \int\limits_{0}^t [90-SpO_2(t)] dt$

where:
HTi : Hypoxic Training index,
t : period of time, and
SpO2 (t) : SpO2 (%), arterial oxygen saturation value measured at one-second intervals.

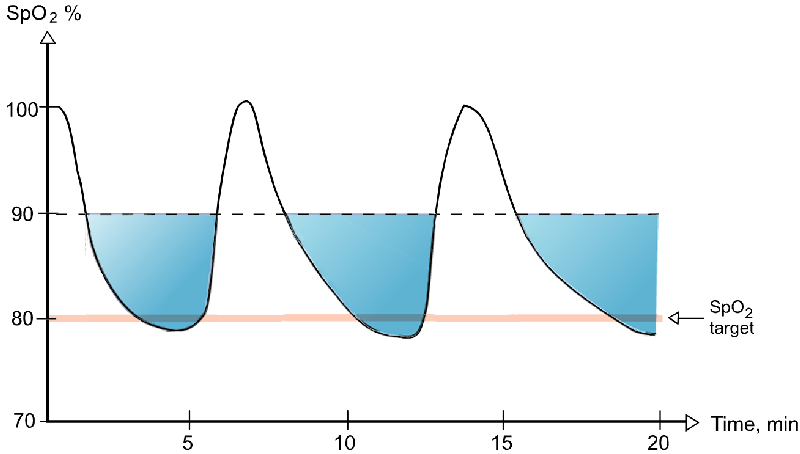
How the HTi is calculated: Only part of the IHT session is shown, the targeted SpO2 value is 80% as an example. The filled part of the SpO2 graph represents the amount of hypoxia delivered, “dosage”.

This image shows a typical SpO2 curve during a full biofeedback-controlled IHT session. (FiO2 is altered automatically using biofeedback controlled hypoxicator to attain and sustain the desired SpO2 target value.)

== Software ==
Advanced biofeedback controlled hypoxicators are capable of adjusting the oxygen concentration in the inhaled hypoxic air automatically. This automatic biofeedback control allows targeting of the desired SpO2, compensating for individual variability. Software is also available to calculate HTi based on readings from a USB connected Pulse Oximeter.
