= Hypoxicator =

Device for providing breathing air with reduced oxygen content

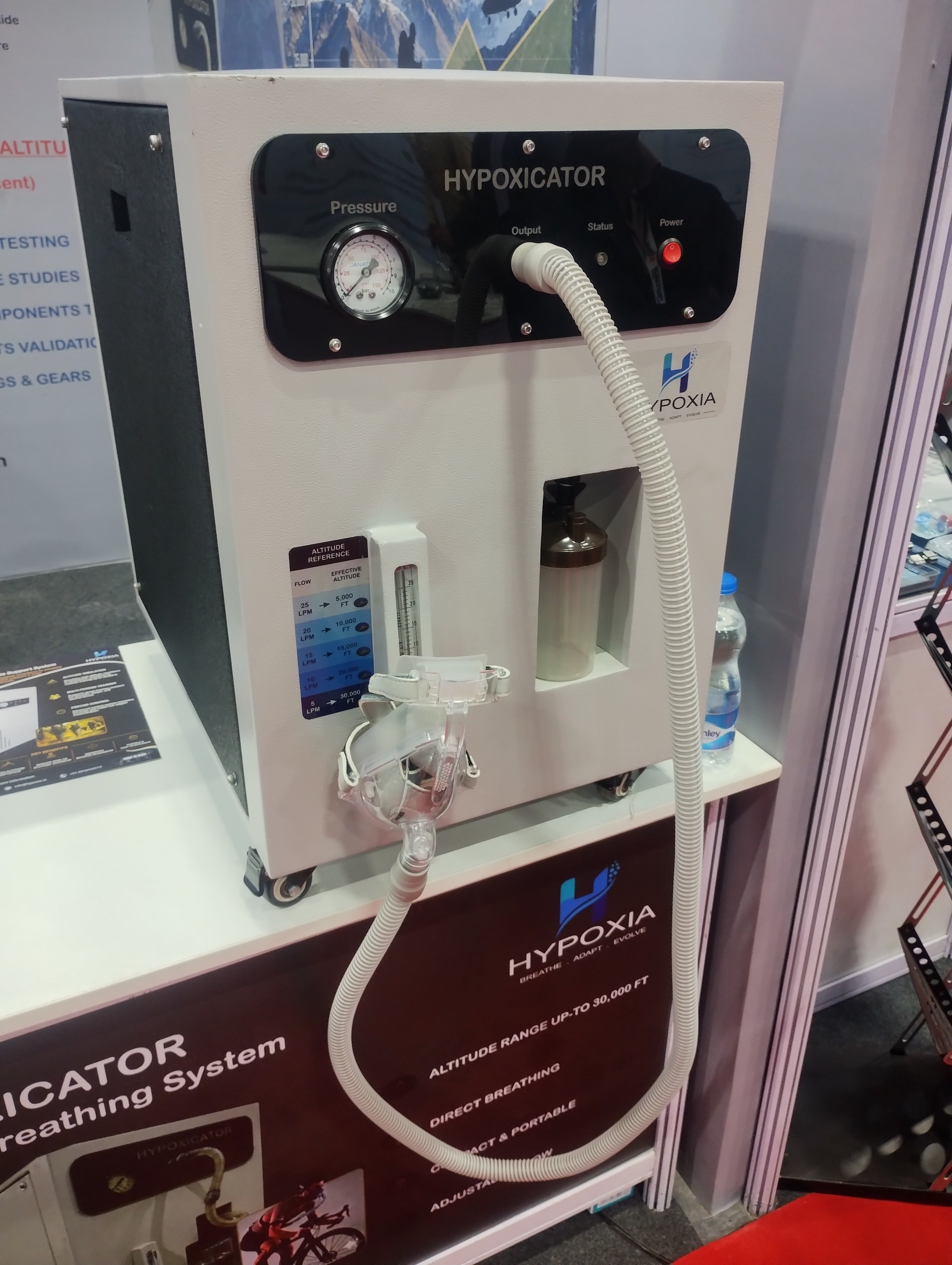
- A hypoxicator at DEF-TECH Bharat 2026, KTPO, Bengaluru
- Specialty: Pulmonology

A hypoxicator is a medical device intended to provide a stimulus for the adaptation of an individual's cardiovascular system by means of breathing reduced oxygen hypoxic air and triggering mechanisms of compensation. The aim of intermittent hypoxic training or hypoxic therapy conducted with such a device is to obtain benefits in physical performance and wellbeing through improved oxygen metabolism.

There are several commercial systems available. Most of these systems have not been cleared for medical applications by the FDA and are used by athletes for altitude training.

Advanced hypoxicators have a built-in pulse oximeter used to monitor and in some cases control the temporary reduction of arterial oxygen saturation that results in physiological responses evident at both systemic and cellular levels even after only a few minutes of hypoxia. Hypoxic Training Index (HTi) can be used to measure the delivered therapeutic dosage over the training session.

The underlying mechanisms of adaptation to mild, non-damaging, short-term (minutes) hypoxic stress (also called - intermittent hypoxic training) are complex and diverse, but are part of normal physiology and are opposite to patho-physiological effects of severe sleep apnea hypoxia.

There are a number of types of hypoxicators that can be distinguished by the method of producing hypoxic air and its delivery to the user's respiratory system. Commonly used are air separation systems employing semi-permeable membrane technology or pressure swing adsorption or (PSAS). There are also non-powered hand-held devices – rebreathers-hypoxicators.

The term hypoxicator was suggested by Russian scientists in 1985 to describe a new class of devices for Intermittent hypoxic training (IHT) – an emerging drug-free treatment for a wide range of degenerative disorders and for simulated altitude training used to achieve greater endurance performance as well as offering pre-acclimatisation for mountaineers – minimising the risk of succumbing to acute mountain sickness on a subsequent ascent.

The hypoxia challenge of IHT is normally delivered in an intermittent manner: 3-7 min of hypoxic air breathing alternated with 1-5 min of normoxic or hyperoxic air. The hypoxicator allows automated and pre-programmed delivery of the required hypoxic and hyperoxic or normoxic air and safety monitoring. The therapeutic range of arterial oxygen desaturation for IHT is SpO_{2} = 75% - 88% and must be selected based upon the recommendation of a medical specialist.

Studies have also shown that hypoxic air treatment may increase the recovery speed and endurance of spinal cord injuries.

There are no reported adverse effects associated with this kind of treatment. However, symptoms of over-training may appear as a result of abusing basic training protocols supplied by manufacturers. Products that do not offer effective and instant monitoring and control over the treatment sessions must be avoided. Pulse oximeters should be used to monitor the level of arterial oxygen saturation that is the basic measure of hypoxic training dosage. Good brands have pulse oximeters integrated into the system and the best hypoxicators are equipped with automated biofeedback hypoxic training control mechanisms.

This type of equipment has been validated as a cost-effective and safe method of assessing respiratory patients' response to the reduced levels of oxygen onboard commercial passenger flights.
