= Buteyko method =

Alternative physical therapy for asthma

The Buteyko method or Buteyko breathing technique is a practice used to help regulate breathing, primarily as a treatment for asthma and other respiratory conditions.

Buteyko asserts that numerous medical conditions, including asthma, are caused or exacerbated by chronically increased respiratory rate or hyperventilation. The method aims to correct hyperventilation and encourage shallower, slower breathing. Treatments include a series of reduced-breathing exercises that focus on nasal-breathing, breath-holding and relaxation.

Advocates of the Buteyko method claim that it can alleviate symptoms and reliance on medication for patients with asthma, chronic obstructive pulmonary disease (COPD), and chronic hyperventilation. The medical community questions these claims, given limited and inadequate evidence supporting the theory and efficacy of the method.

== History ==
The Buteyko method was originally developed in the 1950s by a Ukrainian physiologist Konstantin Buteyko in the Soviet Union.

The first official study into the effectiveness of the Buteyko method on asthma was undertaken in 1968 at the Leningrad Institute of Pulmonology. The second, held at the First Moscow Institute of Pediatric Diseases in April 1980, eventually led to the head of the ministry of health to issue an order (No 591) for the implementation of the Buteyko method in the treatment of bronchial asthma. Later, this method was introduced to Australia, New Zealand, Britain and the United States, where it has received increasing exposure. Anecdotal reports of life-changing improvements attributed to the Buteyko method abound on the Internet and in books.

The Buteyko method is one of a number of breathing retraining methods in use for treating lung diseases, including conventional techniques such as physiotherapist-led breathing exercises as well as alternative medicine techniques such as yoga.

In 2019, the popular Indonesian singer Andien posted images of herself, her husband and their two-year-old son with tape over their mouths on social media. The pictures prompted discussion and interest in the Buteyko method.

== Method ==
The Buteyko method emphasizes the role of carbon dioxide and hyperventilation in respiratory diseases as well as overall health. It is known that hyperventilation can lead to low carbon dioxide levels in the blood (or hypocapnia), which can subsequently lead to disturbances of the acid-base balance in the blood and lower tissue oxygen levels. Advocates of this method assert that the effects of chronic hyperventilation have wider effects than is commonly accepted. These effects include widespread spasms of the muscle in the airways (bronchospasm), disturbance of cell energy production via the Krebs cycle, as well as disturbance of numerous vital homeostatic chemical reactions in the body. The Buteyko method purports to retrain the body's breathing pattern to correct for the presumed chronic hyperventilation and hypocapnia, thereby treating or curing the body of these medical problems.

The Buteyko method is not widely supported in the medical community, in part due to the lack of research supporting the theory that hyperventilation and hypocapnia causes disease, with one review noting the absence of convincing evidence to indicate that trying to change asthmatics' carbon dioxide level is either "desirable or achievable." Some studies that looked to corroborate the theory sought evidence such as by measuring the carbon dioxide levels in practitioners of Buteyko but failed to find conclusive support, leading some to propose alternate theoretical pathways for this method to improve symptoms.

Although variations exist among teachers of the technique in different countries, the main objective is "normalization" of breathing and the three core principles of Buteyko remain the same: nasal breathing, reduced breathing, and relaxation.

=== Nasal breathing ===
The Buteyko method emphasizes the importance of nasal breathing, which protects the airways by humidifying, warming, and cleaning the air entering the lungs. Many asthmatics have problems sleeping at night, and this is thought by Buteyko practitioners to be linked with poor posture and/or mouth breathing. By keeping the nose clear and encouraging nasal breathing during the day, night-time symptoms can also improve. Strictly nasal breathing during physical exercise is another key element of the Buteyko method.

=== Reduced breathing exercises ===
The core Buteyko exercises involve breath control: consciously reducing breathing volume. Many teachers refer to Buteyko as 'breathing retraining' and compare the method to learning to ride a bicycle. They say that after adequate practice time, the techniques become instinctive and the exercises are gradually phased out as the condition improves.

Buteyko uses a measurement called the control pause (CP), the amount of time between breaths that an individual can comfortably hold breath. According to Buteyko teachers, people with asthma who regularly practice Buteyko breathing will notice an increase in CP and decrease in pulse rate that corresponds to decreased asthma symptoms.

=== Relaxation ===
Buteyko practice emphasizes relaxation to counter asthma attacks. The first feeling of an asthma attack is unsettling and can result in a short period of rapid breathing. Buteyko method claims that by controlling this initial over-breathing phase, asthmatics can prevent a "vicious circle of over-breathing" from developing and spiraling into an asthma attack.

== Medical evidence ==
Advocates of the Buteyko method claim that it can treat a wide range of other diseases and symptoms (numbering up to 150), including diabetes. However, studies into the effectiveness of Buteyko have focused almost exclusively on asthma with a small amount of research on sleep apnea. Some members of the medical community have been skeptical of the efficacy of Buteyko due to the often "exaggerated and unsubstantiated claims" earlier made by Buteyko practitioners.

There are few high quality studies such as randomized controlled trials looking at the efficacy of treating asthma with "breathing retraining" methods in general, which include the Buteyko method, yoga training and other relaxation techniques. Many of the studies that have evaluated breathing retraining have significant methodological flaws, including small sample sizes, possible patient selection bias as well as heterogeneity in design that makes coming to a firm conclusion difficult. These studies are also hampered by the difficulty in proper blinding and placebo control which could introduce more bias into these studies.

In 2015 the Australian Government's Department of Health published the results of a review of alternative therapies that sought to determine if any were suitable for being covered by health insurance; the Buteyko method was one of 17 therapies evaluated for which no clear evidence of effectiveness was found. A 2020 Cochrane review has found that breathing exercises may have some positive impact on quality of life, hyperventilation symptoms and lung function (moderate to very low certainty). A 2014 British clinical guideline said that for adults the Buteyko method could improve some asthma symptoms and quality of life, but that it had little impact on lung function.

== See also ==
- Hypoventilation training
- Intermittent hypoxic training
- Papworth method
- Wim Hof
