= Papworth method =

The Papworth method is a specific diaphragmatic breathing technique that was developed in the 1960s. The technique emphasises nose breathing and the development of a breathing pattern to suit current activity. It also involves relaxation exercises that, in concert with the breathing technique, have been purported to aid depression and anxiety.

Developed at Papworth Hospital in Cambridgeshire, England, the method seeks to control "over-breathing" (rapid shallow breaths taken at the top of the chest) that are usually associated with persons under stressful conditions. The aim is to encourage gentler, more relaxed breathing, using the abdomen and diaphragm rather than the chest.

== Effectiveness ==
The first known randomised controlled trial to investigate the Papworth breathing technique has shown that it can cut asthma symptoms by a third in patients with mild asthma.

Elizabeth A. Holloway and Robert J. West from University College London (UCL) randomised 85 people with mild asthma to either five sessions of treatment by the breathing and relaxation method on top of their medical care or to usual drug therapy alone. Patients scored an average of 21.8 on the St George's Respiratory Symptom Questionnaire after completing five treatment sessions of the Papworth method in addition to their usual therapy. Patients who had not been given the therapy scored 32.8.

This improvement in symptoms was still maintained one year later. At 12 months patients who had been treated using the technique scored 24.9, while patients who had not scored 33.5.

== See also ==
- Hyperventilation syndrome
- Buteyko method, another breathing method that emphasizes relaxed nasal breathing to combat overbreathing
