= Universal Tennis Rating =

Global tennis player rating system

Universal Tennis Rating (UTR) is the global tennis player rating system intended to produce an objective, consistent, and accurate index of players' skill in the game of tennis. UTR rates all players on a single 16-point scale, without regard to age, gender, nationality, or locale of a given match. All professional players in the Association of Tennis Professionals (ATP) and the Women’s Tennis Association (WTA) have UTRs, as do most college players and many junior tournament players worldwide, as well as many adult league and tournament players. The UTR database includes results from more than 8 million matches and 200+ countries. More than 800,000 players have UTRs.

Players, coaches, tournament directors, tennis clubs, tennis leagues, and national federations use UTR in varied ways. These include picking entrants and recruiting players for college teams, scheduling competitive matches with other teams or individuals, finding local playing or training partners, and others. Until 2023, UTR was the official rating system of the Intercollegiate Tennis Association (ITA). In January 2018, the Tennis Channel announced its partnership with UTR, making the rating system part of the Tennis Channel's coverage of events.

== Definition of Universal Tennis Rating ==
Universal Tennis Rating (UTR) is an index that intends to generate a reliable and accurate rating for players' tennis skill. UTR rates all players—men, women, and children—on a single 16-point scale (with two decimal places, e.g., 11.29) that works for players globally regardless of their skill level, from beginners to top professional competitors.

UTR's algorithm calculates ratings from the last 30 eligible matches played within the preceding 12 months. The main data points are the percentage of games won (not simply the won/lost result), and the opponent’s rating. Each match played generates a rating. A player’s UTR is a weighted average of all eligible matches.

== Ratings versus Rankings ==
Although tennis is a global sport, it does not have a common international rating system. Tennis has nothing comparable to the handicap system (though in France les classements par handicaps (classifications by handicap) and les classements par rangs (classifications by ranks) has a handicap built into their ratings) in golf for example, which enables all golfers to record their scores on specific courses, generating a handicap that is valid on any golf course in the world.

In tennis, the vast majority of competitive players enter events only in their geographical locale. Whatever ranking they earn has meaning only within that region or country. Worldwide, hundreds of national federations govern tennis, and multiple ranking systems frequently exist within a single nation. There may be as many as 2,700 different tennis ranking and rating systems around the world.

Furthermore, nearly all of these are ranking systems, not rating systems. Rankings sort players into a "pecking order," assigning each athlete a spot relative to all others ranked in that system. Rankings are ordinal numbers that reflect only the athletes' relative positions, not their playing skill as measured by a standard yardstick.

UTR, in contrast, rates each athlete on a single, standard metric. Therefore, tennis players' UTRs are largely independent of each other, aside from the algorithm's weighting of the strength of opponents who compete directly with the rated player.

Nearly all tennis ranking systems use a "points per round" (PPR) method that assigns points depending on what round a player reaches in a given tournament, along with the rated "strength" of that tournament in terms of the players it accepts into the draw. This is administratively easy, but it does not consider the skill level of the individual opponents a player faced in the event. Paradoxically, the PPR method can create an incentive to seek out weaker tournaments, in which it will be easier to survive into later rounds.

The plethora of ranking systems and the lack of a shared metric has created a “Tower of Babel” in international tennis. National federations, tournaments, coaches, teams, colleges, and individual players speak different languages that do not readily translate into one another. Consequently, the International Tennis Federation (ITF) and many of tennis' national governing bodies, including the United States Tennis Association (USTA), have become interested in developing a standard rating method, a kind of "metric system" for tennis that, like a golf handicap, could function globally.

“The UTR system is designed for tennis in so many ways,” said former ATP Player Council president Eric Butorac, in a 2015 Sports Illustrated story on UTR. “At a UTR event, you are guaranteed to play against players who are close to your ability level. I have played a lot in France, where they have a similar system, and it works so efficiently. I hope the whole world gets on board with UTR, as it could drastically change worldwide tennis for the better.”

== History of Universal Tennis Rating ==
Virginia tennis professional Dave Howell launched UTR in 2008 as a private company to promote the rating system he developed and tested successfully in southeastern Virginia. Alex Cancado, a tennis player and web designer in the area, developed an algorithm to operationalize Howell’s rating system. Howell brought in some early followers as partners and began to concentrate full-time on developing the UTR.

In his coaching career, Howell had mentored junior players from the United States who entered French tournaments. Juniors in the U.S. compete under various ranking systems, including a widely used PPR system administered by the USTA. In contrast, France employs a national rating system based on head-to-head won/lost results. This enables French tournament directors to facilitate "level-based play" — orchestrating matches between players of comparable skill, often without regard to their age or gender. French tournaments often use staggered-entry draws that allow stronger players to enter a tournament in later rounds. This design enables a single event to embrace a wide range of skill levels, from club players up to touring professionals, but the French classification system ensures a high probability of even matches for entrants at all levels.

Howell found that the French national rating system yielded events that were, overall, far more competitive than junior events in the U.S. To study why this was so, he defined a "competitive" match as one in which the losing player wins more than half the minimum number of games needed to win the match. In the common "best 2-of-3 set" format, that equals seven games, as the winner must take at least 12 games to capture the match. Hence, a result of 6–3, 6-4 or closer reaches the "competitive threshold," as defined by UTR. After statistically analysing thousands of USTA boys' and girls' junior tournament matches at all levels, Howell found that on average, only about one match in four (27 percent) was competitive; USTA national junior events reached the 40 percent level.

Howell modelled UTR on the French system, developing, with his colleagues, an algorithm that calculated ratings from head-to-head results with specific opponents, taking their rated skill into account. He and his colleagues also made UTR more precise than the French system by entering the number of games won in a match, not only the won/lost result. The use of Howell's rating system in Virginia produced junior tournaments with substantially more competitive matches — a rate that equalled the 50-60 percent level typically seen at the top tiers of college and professional tennis.

The Founders of the Universal Tennis Rating are: Dave Howell, Darryl Cummings, Alexandre Cancado, Steve Clark, Niclas Kohler, Johan Varverud, Raquel Araujo Kohler, and Patricia Araujo Cancado.

=== Adoption and Usage of UTR ===
UTR gradually spread from Virginia to other tennis venues in the United States, particularly in junior events which, as noted, often include many non-competitive matches. The system also gained traction in college tennis, which in recent decades has evolved into a truly global sport that embraces young athletes from all tennis-playing nations. But the prevalence of so many ranking and rating systems in international tennis confronted college coaches in the United States with serious problems evaluating the caliber of international recruits. By offering a standard, reliable index of skill applicable worldwide, UTR answered this quandary. Consequently, in recent years UTR has become a "gold standard" for assessing collegiate tennis recruits, both internationally and domestically. UTR also helps recruits match themselves with appropriate college programs.

A leading proponent of UTR, Dave Fish, head men’s tennis coach at Harvard University, states that “The Universal Tennis Rating system is now being recognized by many college coaches as the best metric available for judging junior talent. While the recruiting benefits of UTR are evident for both coaches and recruits, the widespread use of the Universal Tennis approach to tournament play promises to transform the entire player development system of tennis in America.”

Since 2011, the Intercollegiate Tennis Association (ITA), the governing body for college tennis in the U.S., has worked closely with Universal Tennis and now relies on UTR data to determine event seeding at U.S. college invitationals; seeding and selection for its 51 ITA/Oracle Summer Circuit tournaments; and seeding and selection in the Oracle ITA Junior Masters events. In 2016, the ITA made UTR its official rating system for college tennis in the United States. In 2023, UTR was replaced by the World Tennis Number (WTN) as the exclusive official rating for college tennis.

UTR also extended into the professional game, where all ATP and WTA players now have UTRs.

National federations have recognized the value of UTR for attracting players to tennis and for developing their skill through competitive matches. Currently more than 40 national tennis federations have committed to submitting tournament results to UTR. These include the Lawn Tennis Association of Great Britain, Tennis Canada, Tennis Australia, the Brazilian Tennis Confederation, and the Bulgarian Tennis Federation.

In January 2018, the Tennis Channel announced its partnership with UTR, making the rating system part of the Tennis Channel's coverage of competition.

At the same time, a new ownership group assumed control of UTR, which is based in San Francisco, California. Universal Tennis’s chairman and CEO is Mark Leschly, founder and managing partner of Iconica Partners, a global investment firm specializing in the intersection of technology, sports, and media, which heads the new ownership. The group's partners include Mark Hurd, CEO of Oracle Corporation; Ken Hao, managing partner of Silver Lake Partners; Jan Leschly, former CEO of SmithKline Beecham, a former top-ten ATP player and former chairman of the International Tennis Hall of Fame; Ken Solomon, president of the Tennis Channel; the Tennis Media Company; Major League Baseball; and the Los Angeles Dodgers' ownership group.

== Concept of Universal Tennis Rating ==
Recreational tennis — friends hitting with each other or playing games — accounts for the majority of tennis. But at the competitive level, junior play in the United States and elsewhere sorts players into age groups. Typically, this means separate tournaments for players aged 12-and-under, 14-and-under, 16-and-under, and 18-and-under. Tournaments also separate boys and girls into separate draws. Adult events normally sort entrants by half-decades, using minimum instead of maximum ages (35-and-over, 40-and-over, etc.) Separating players into groups by age and gender does organize draws simply, but it also throws together competitors in ways that are unrelated to their tennis skill.

Entry to, and seedings in, tournaments typically derive from players’ rankings. These in turn depend on PPR amassed in previous tournaments, regardless of opponents' strengths or actual match scores. The resulting draws often pit top players against much lower-ranked athletes, especially in early rounds, frequently leading to one-sided matches.

In contrast, designing draws or flights with UTR consistently produces many more matches between athletes of roughly equal ability. Two players whose UTRs fall within 1.0 of each other will have a competitive match two to three times as often as those with ratings more than 1.0 apart. Furthermore, research has shown that when players' UTRs differ by more than 1.0 point, the lower-rated athlete will upset his or her higher-rated opponent only 3 percent of the time.

Close, competitive contests are widely recognized by coaches as the most powerful engine for developing tennis skill. Even matches benefit both players. Non-competitive, one-sided matches, in contrast, typically discourage the loser and fail to challenge the winner, offering neither one much opportunity to improve his or her skills.

== The Universal Tennis Rating Scale ==
Universal Tennis Ratings are expressed as a number with up to two decimal points falling between 1.0 and 16.50, e.g., 9.46. UTR's 16-point scale embraces everyone from beginners through intermediate recreational and competitive players, to active tournament and college varsity athletes, and ranging up to the highest levels of the game at the top professional ranks.

For example, as of January 2018, Rafael Nadal of Spain held a UTR of 16.27 and Switzerland's Roger Federer was at 16.21. In that month, Serena Williams of the United States reached a rating of 13.44 while Simona Halep of Romania reached a rating of 13.38 later that year. In April 2022, Ash Barty reached a rating of 13.42. In 2023, Novak Djokovic reached a UTR of 16.46. In 2025, Carlos Alcaraz reached a UTR of 16.41 and Jannik Sinner reached a UTR of 16.48.

The vast majority of UTRs derive from sanctioned tournament results. Universal Tennis regularly records results from all ATP, WTA, and ITF Junior and Futures events; all sanctioned USTA junior events, and all ITA (Intercollegiate Tennis Association) and NCAA dual matches and tournaments. UTR also incorporates results from a growing number of national federations. It updates and maintains ratings for more than 800,000 current competitors, and its database includes 8 million match results. To ensure verification, UTR only accepts match results that have been published on the internet.

Each rated player has a profile on the UTR website, with a singles and doubles rating based on up to 30 of the most recent matches played in a 12-month period. These profiles display the match scores along with competitors’ names and ratings. Profiles also include hometowns and, when applicable, the player's college or school team. College teams, and a growing number of high-school teams, have profile pages of their own, listing their varsity athletes and associated rating data.

In addition to including the percentage of matches that reached the competitive threshold, profiles indicate the reliability of the displayed ratings. When a new player first appears in published and/or sanctioned tournament results, that player’s rating will have a low reliability percentage. Once the athlete has played five or more matches against opponents with 100-percent reliable ratings, his/her own rating will be certified as 100 percent reliable.
