= Konstantin Buteyko =

Soviet physician

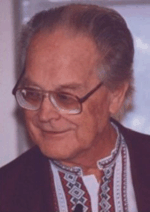
- Born: 27 January 1923; Ivanitsa near Kyiv, Kyivshchyna, Ukraine
- Died: 2 May 2003 (aged 80); Moscow, Russia
- Years active: 1952–2003
- Known for: Pioneering the Buteyko method
- Medical career
- Profession: Physician
- Institutions: First Moscow Institute of Medicine
- Sub-specialties: Asthma and Respiratory disease

Konstantin Pavlovich Buteyko (January 27, 1923 – May 2, 2003) was a Ukrainian-born Soviet physician and the creator of the Buteyko method for the treatment of asthma and other breathing disorders.

== Early life ==
Buteyko was born in 1923 into a farming family in Ivanitsa, Ukraine (about 150 kilometers from Kyiv; presently Ivanytsya, Chernihiv Oblast, Ukraine).

He was accepted to Kyiv Polytechnic Institute to study mechanics, but World War II interrupted his studies and he spent four years "fixing cars, tanks and artillery for the Soviet army" on the front lines.

During the war or shortly after, Buteyko had become tired of mechanics and made the decision to go into medicine.

When the War ended, I decided to start researching the most complex machine, the Man. I thought if I learnt him, I'd be able to diagnose his diseases as easily as I had diagnosed machine disorders.

— Konstantin Buteyko, Interview in 1982

== Medical training ==
In 1946, Buteyko enrolled at the First Moscow Institute of Medicine, then considered the Soviet Union's leading medical school. He graduated in 1952 and became a resident at the Department of Therapeutics under the direction of Evgeny Mikhaylovich Tareyev. During his medical studies he was given a project of making observations on patients' breathing rates in relation to the severity and prognosis of their illness. He soon came to the conclusion that there was an association between these two factors, such that as a patient's condition became more severe so their breathing rate increased. Buteyko claimed he "noticed that breathing became deeper as death approached: I could tell the day or even hour of the patient's death by how deeply they breathed."

Buteyko himself suffered from malignant hypertension (at age 29, his systolic blood pressure was 212 mmHg), whose symptoms included debilitating headaches and pain in the stomach, heart, and kidney. He was given a life expectancy of a year.

Buteyko claimed to have discovered his method on October 7, 1952. While on duty, Buteyko says "a thought occurred to me that the hypertensive disease which I was developing very rapidly could be a consequence of the deep breathing." He began decreasing his breath and a minute later his headache and pain in the heart and kidney had disappeared. He then tried breathing deeply again and the pain returned.

== Developing the method ==
In 1959 Buteyko began a clinical trial of 200 patients to test his method.

By the early 1980s the Soviet authorities were sufficiently impressed with Buteyko's results to allow him a formal trial, or "approbation" with asthmatic children in a Moscow hospital. Although very different in design from the standard controlled trial now predominant in the West, the results were sufficiently impressive to persuade the State Medical System to approve the method for widespread use.

Buteyko used a machine called the "combine-complexator" which was able to measure the carbon dioxide content of the blood, alveoli, and inhaled and exhaled air, as well as changes in blood pressure and heart rate.

== Personal life ==
In 1969, Buteyko's future wife Ludmila read about Buteyko through a newspaper article and reached out by writing a letter. At the time, Ludmila and her son, Andrey, were in Moscow and Buteyko was in Siberia, but during his next visit to Moscow, Buteyko visited the two at their home and taught them the method. Ludmila and Andrey later also became teachers of the Buteyko method.

Buteyko also had a son, Vladimir Buteyko.

Buteyko died in Moscow, Russia on May 2, 2003, aged 80, and was buried in Feodosia, Crimea.

== Publications ==
- Buteyko K. (1990). The Buteyko Method, An Experience of Use in Medicine. Moscow: "Patriot" Publishers.
