= Institute of Health Technology, Rajshahi =

Health institute in Rajshahi, Bangladesh

- Paramedical, Rajshahi or I.H.T, Rajshahi
- Institute of Health Technology, Rajshahi Logo
- Other name: I.H.T Rajshahi
- Type: Governmental
- Established: 1976
- Affiliations: University of Rajshahi
- Academic affiliations: Pharmacy Council of Bangladesh, State medical faculty of Bangladesh
- Principal: Farhana Haque
- Faculty: 38+
- Administrative staff: 6+
- Students: 1215+
- Location: Rajshahi, Bangladesh

Institute of Health Technology, Rajshahi or I.H.T Rajshahi is one of the government medical institutes in Rajshahi, Bangladesh. In 1976, it started with only 75 students.

== History ==
In 1976, a paramedical institute was established in Laxmipur district of Rajshahi for people of Rajshahi. It was established at the three Faculty (Pharmacy, Lab-medicine and Radiography) . Gradually increased the number of faculty. It has nearly 1050 students currently studying in 7 faculties. At first its name was "paramedical". From 12 July 1989 the institute changed the name. Students are admitted to the BSc course from 2009 to 2010 when the course was started. BSc courses in two faculties (BSc in Medical Technology Laboratory and BSc in physiotherapy) started functioning with 60 students.

== Buildings ==
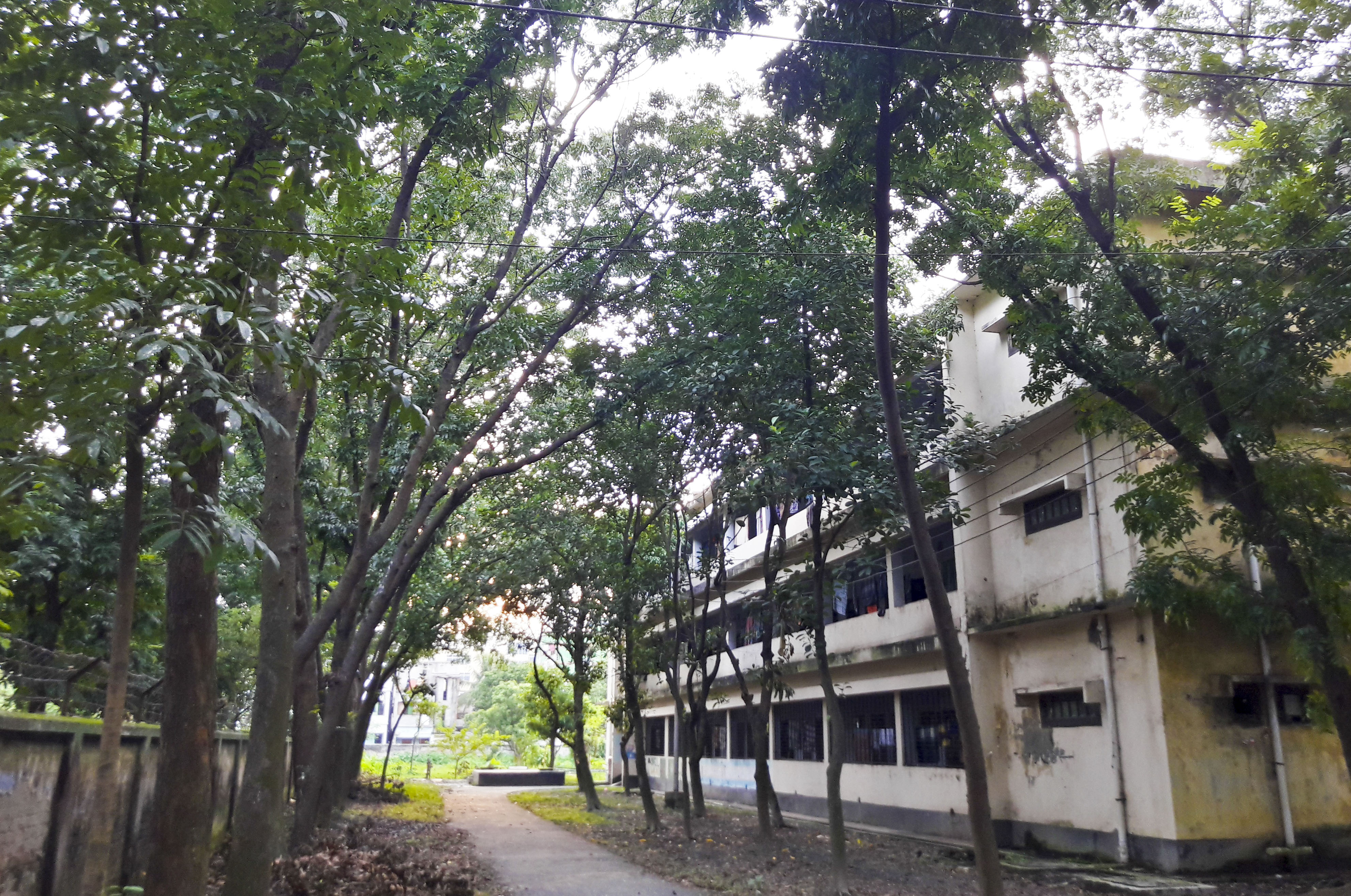
Boys Hostel

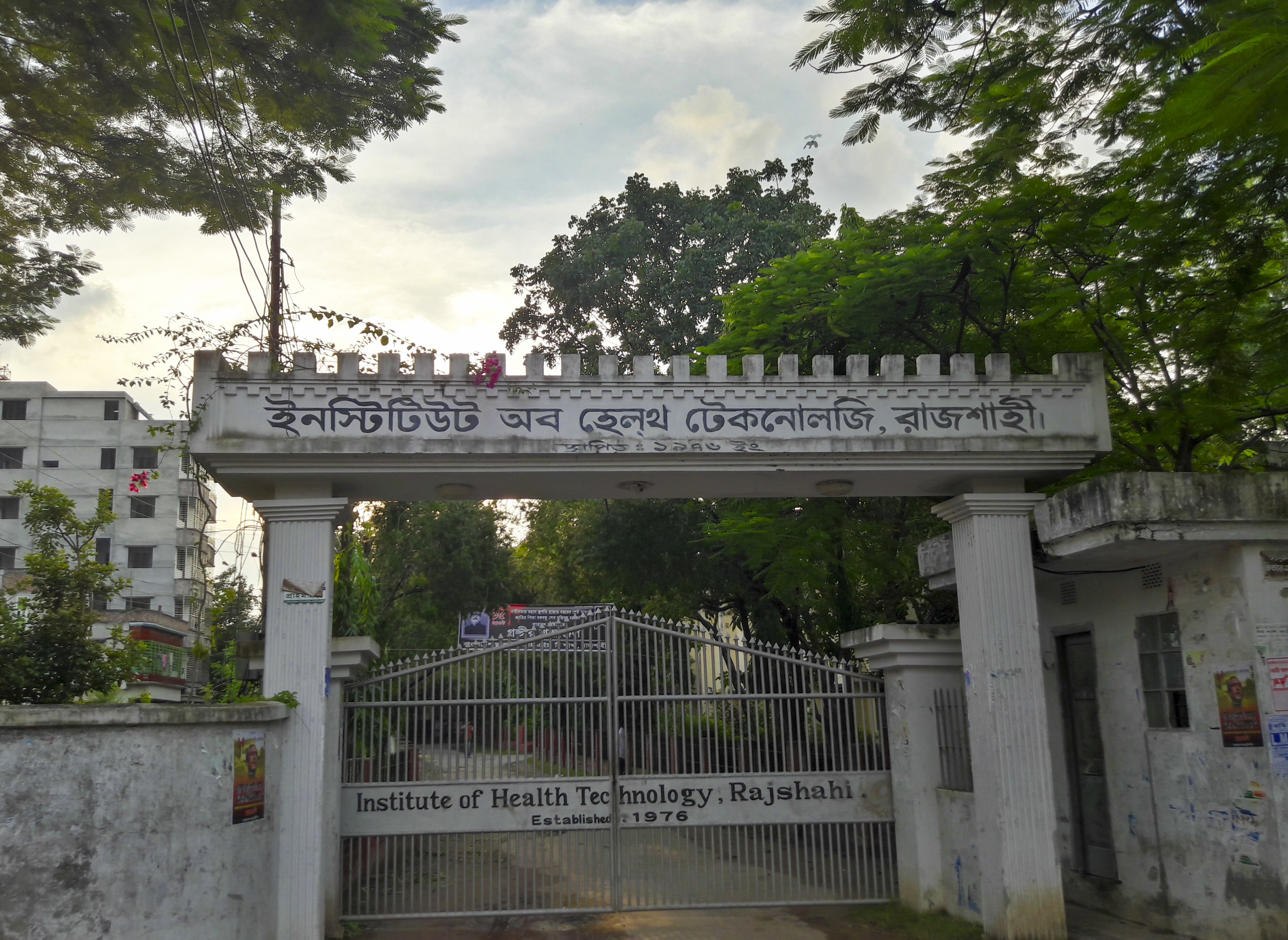
Main Gate

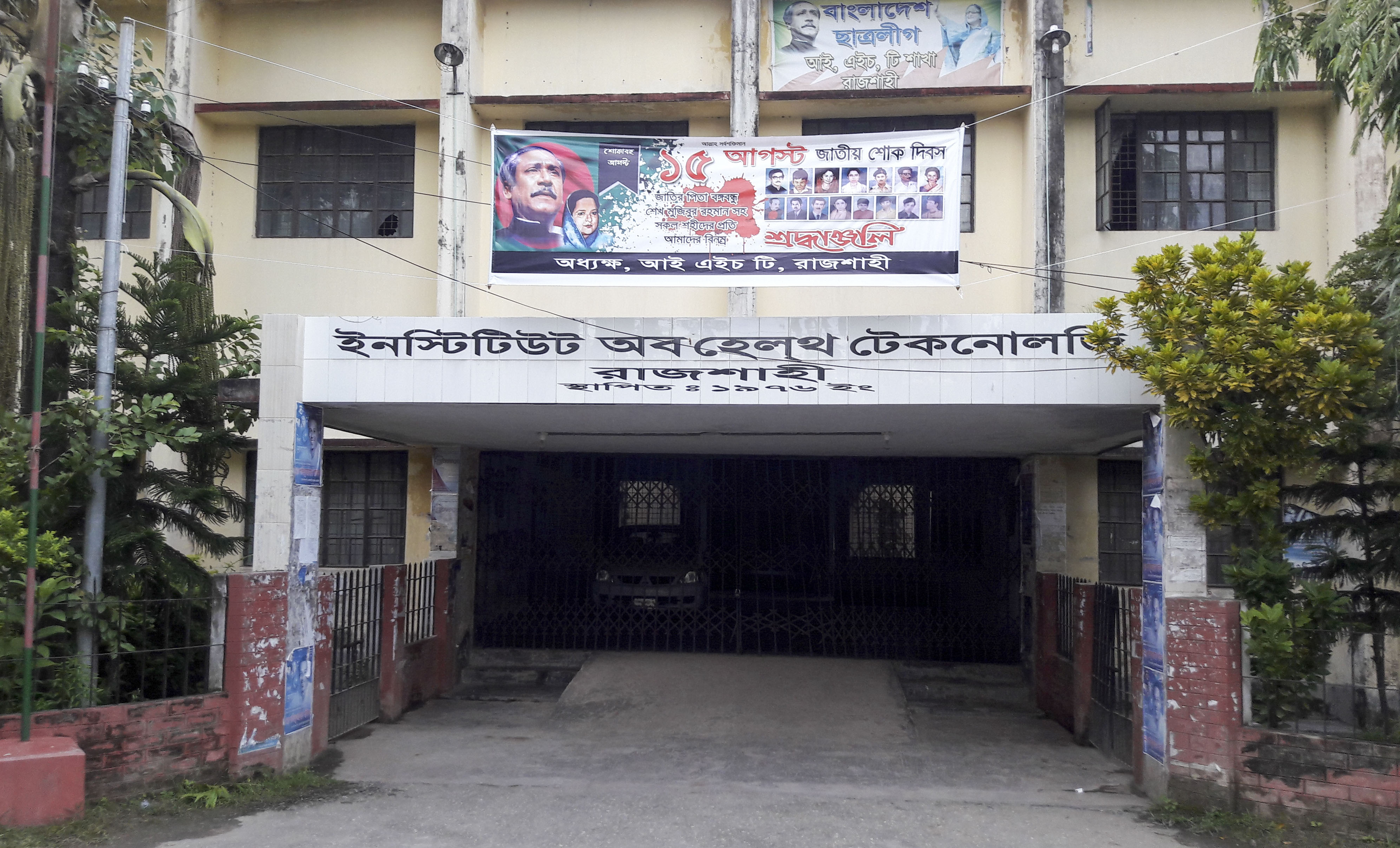
Academic Building

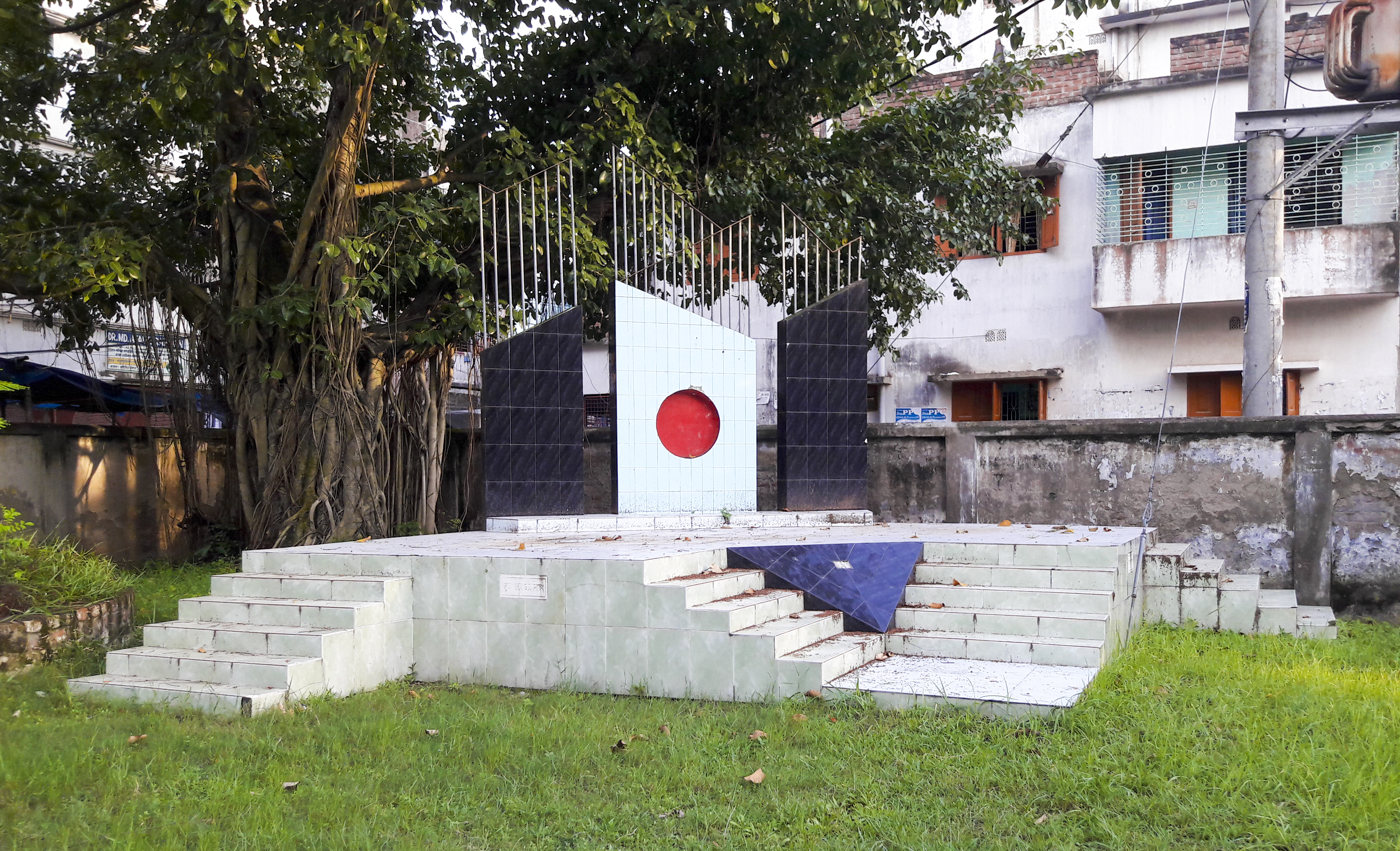
Monument

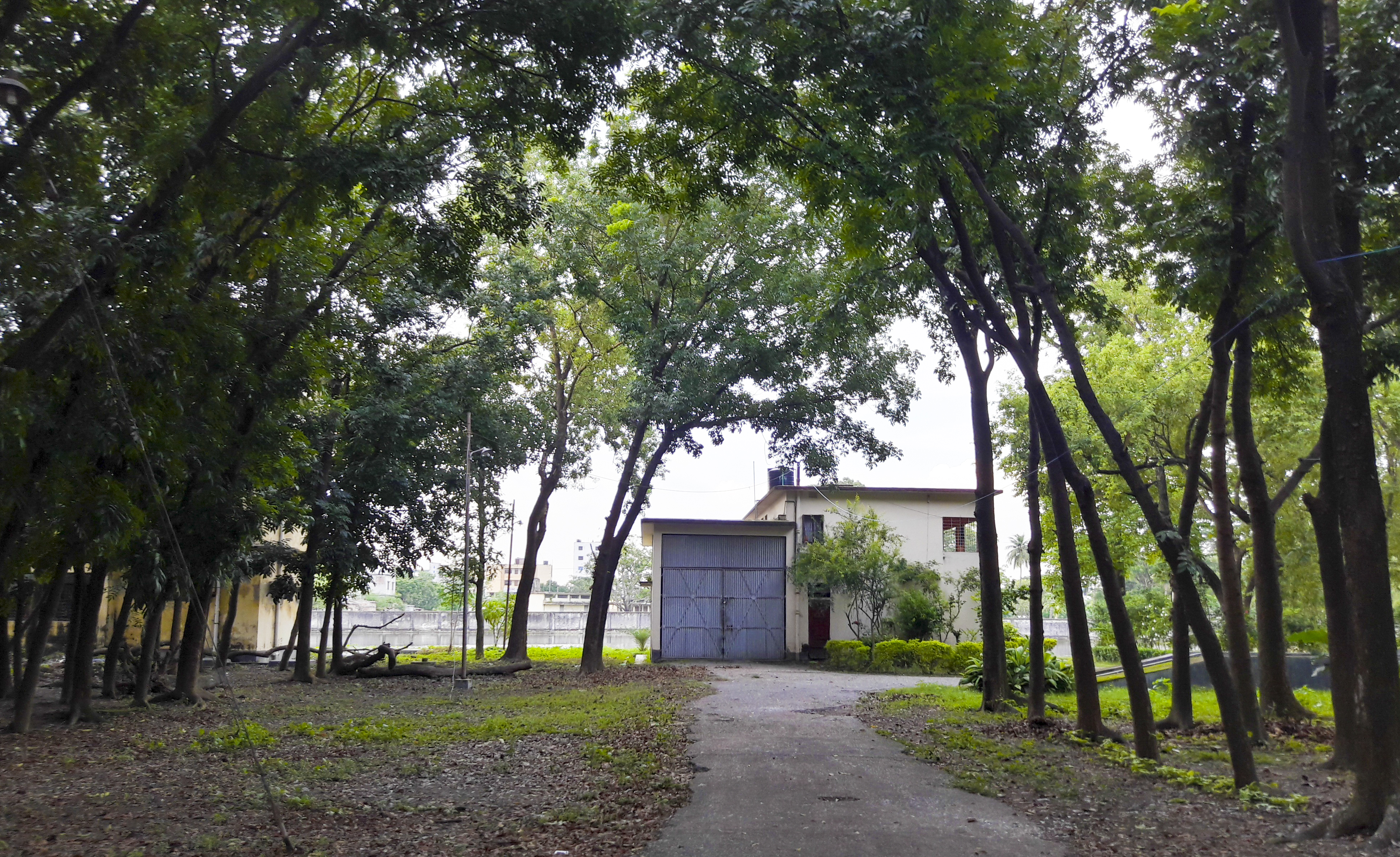
Principals quarter

== Laboratory ==
At the Institute of Health Technology, Rajshahi, all departments have a different laboratory. According to the department, work is to be performed in a variety of experiments.

== Library ==
Institute of Health Technology, Rajshahi have an enriched library.

== Publications ==
At I.H.T Rajshahi, Anniversary & the popular periodicals are published regularly. All the students and teachers at the institute can write.

== Courses ==
=== Diploma ===
1. Diploma in Dental Technology
2. Diploma in Laboratory Medicine
3. Diploma in Pharmacy
4. Diploma in Physiotherapy
5. Diploma in Radiotherapy
6. Diploma in Radiology & Imaging
7. Diploma in Sanitary inspectorship training

=== BSc ===
1. BSc in Medical technology (Laboratory)
2. BSc in physiotherapy ()
