= Intermittent hypoxic therapy =

Technique for improving human performance by adaptation to reduced oxygen

Intermittent hypoxic therapy, also known as intermittent hypoxic training (IHT), is a technique aimed at improving human performance by way of adaptation to reduced oxygen.

An IHT session consists of an interval of several minutes breathing hypoxic (low oxygen) air, alternated with intervals breathing ambient (normoxic) or hyperoxic air. The procedure may be repeated several times in variable-length sessions per day, depending on a physician's prescription or a manufacturer's protocol. Standard practice is for the patient to remain stationary while breathing hypoxic air via a hand-held mask. The therapy is delivered using a hypoxicator during the day time, allowing the dosage to be monitored. Biofeedback can be delivered using a pulse oximeter.

== Effects ==
A number of effects are reported. It is important to differentiate between physiological adaptations to mild hypoxia and re-oxygenation episodes (i.e., the IHT protocol) and frequent nocturnal suffocation awakenings produced by sleep apnea, which might result in various pathologies.

== Applications ==
IHT has been used to try to improve performance in sports. and has been used in a number of health conditions.

== See also ==
- Buteyko method
- Hypoventilation training
