= Hypoventilation training =

Physical training method

Hypoventilation training is a physical training method in which periods of exercise with reduced breathing frequency are interspersed with periods with normal breathing. The hypoventilation technique consists of short breath holdings and can be performed in different types of exercise: running, cycling, swimming, rowing, skating, etc.

Generally, there are two ways to carry out hypoventilation: at high lung volume or at low lung volume. At high lung volume, breath holdings are performed with the lungs full of air (inhalation then breath hold). Conversely, during hypoventilation at low lung volume, breath holdings are performed with the lung half full of air. To do so, one has to first exhale normally, without forcing, then hold one's breath. This is called the exhale-hold technique.

The scientific studies have shown that only hypoventilation at low lung volume could lead to both a significant decrease in oxygen (O_{2}) concentrations in the body and an increase in carbon dioxide concentrations (CO_{2}), which are indispensable for the method to be effective.

== History ==
The first known form of hypoventilation occurred in the 1950s during training of the runners of Eastern Europe and former USSR. One of the most famous athletes to have used this method is Emil Zátopek, the Czech long-distance runner, four times Olympic gold medalist and former holder of 18 world records. Zátopek, who was a precursor in training, regularly used to run by holding his breath to harden his training and simulate the conditions of competition. However, at that time, the effects of hypoventilation training were completely unknown and the method was applied very empirically.

At the beginning of the 1970s, American swim coach James Counsilman used a new training technique which involved taking a limited number of inhalations while swimming laps in a pool. The effect of this kind of training was determined to decrease the body's O_{2} content and simulate altitude training. Due to the method's efficacy, hypoventilation became a common training method for many swimmers.

It is especially from the 1980s that the scientific studies on exercise with reduced breathing frequency began to be published. While the method advocated by Counsilman attracted a following in some runners and athletics coaches, the results of the studies contradicted the hypotheses put forward by the World of Sport. They showed that this training method did not decrease body O_{2} concentrations and provoked only a hypercapnic effect, i.e. an increase in CO_{2} concentrations. Both the effectiveness and legitimacy of hypoventilation training were strongly challenged.

Since the middle of the 2000s, a series of studies has been conducted by French researchers of Paris 13 University to propose a new approach to hypoventilation training. Xavier Woorons and his team hypothesized that if breath holdings were carried out with the lungs half-full of air, rather than full of air as performed so far, it would be possible to significantly reduce body oxygenation. The results that were published confirmed the hypotheses. They demonstrated that through hypoventilation at low lung volume, that is the exhale-hold technique, it was possible, without leaving sea level, to decrease O_{2} concentrations in the blood and in the muscles at levels corresponding to altitudes above 2000 m.

== Physiological effects ==
When exercise is being performed, if the exhale-hold technique is properly applied, a decrease in O_{2} concentrations and an increase in CO_{2} concentrations occur in the lungs, the blood and the muscles. The combined effect of hypoxia and hypercapnia act as a strong stimulus whose main consequence is to increase lactic acid and hydrogen ions production, and therefore to provoke a strong acidosis in the body. Thus, during exercise with hypoventilation, the blood and muscle acid–base homeostasis is highly disturbed. The studies have also reported an increase in all heart activity when hypoventilation is carried out in terrestrial sports. Cardiac output, heart rate, stroke volume and sympathetic modulation to the heart are greater when exercise with hypoventilation is performed in running or cycling. A slightly higher blood pressure has also been recorded. In swimming on the other hand, no significant change in the heart activity has been found.

After several weeks of hypoventilation training, physiological adaptations occur that delay the onset of acidosis during a maximal exertion test. The studies have shown that at a given workload, pH and blood bicarbonate concentrations were higher, whereas lactate concentrations had a tendency to decrease. The reduction in acidosis would be due to an improvement in buffer capacity at the muscle level. However, no change advantageous to aerobic metabolism has been found. Maximal oxygen uptake (VO_{2}max), the number of red blood cells and the anaerobic threshold were not modified after hypoventilation training.

== Benefits of the method ==
By delaying acidosis, hypoventilation training would also delay the onset of fatigue and would therefore improve performance during strenuous exertions of short to moderate durations. After several weeks of hypoventilation training, performance gains between 1 and 4% have been reported in running and swimming. The method could be interesting to use in sports requiring strenuous repeated or continuous exertions, whose duration does not exceed a dozen minutes: swimming, middle-distance running, cycling, combat sports, team sports, racquet sports, etc.

Another advantage of hypoventilation training is to stimulate the anaerobic metabolism without using high exercise intensities, which are more traumatizing for the locomotor system and therefore increase the risk of injuries. Athletes who return progressively to their sporting activity after being injured, and who therefore have to protect their muscles, joints and tendons, could train at low or moderate intensity with hypoventilation.

== Disadvantages of the method ==
Hypoventilation training is physically demanding. This method is intended for highly motivated athletes, who do not have pulmonary or cardiovascular issues and whose primary objective is performance. Furthermore, exercising with hypoventilation can provoke headaches if the breath holdings are maintained too long or repeated over a too long period of time. Finally, this training method does not seem to be beneficial for endurance sports.

== See also ==
- Buteyko method
- Hypoventilation
- Hypoxia
- Hypercapnia

== Recommended reading ==
- Woorons, Xavier, Hypoventilation training, push your limits!, Arpeh, 2014, 164p. (ISBN 978-2-9546040-1-5)
