= USTA Tennis on Campus =

- Sport: Team tennis
- Founded: 2000
- Owner: United States Tennis Association
- No. of teams: 370
- Most recent champion: UCLA (2026)
- Most titles: California (6)
- Website: tennisoncampus.com

Tennis on Campus (TOC) is the national collegiate club tennis league operated by the United States Tennis Association (USTA). The league is played on hard courts in World TeamTennis format. 370 colleges throughout the 15 USTA geographical sections nationwide compete in the league.

The league's regular season takes place in the fall and spring along with four major tournaments, culminating with the National Championship.

== Competition format ==
The regular season games are played in tournaments which are hosted by individual universities at their campus tennis facilities or a local tennis center. The matches are played in mixed gender World TeamTennis format which features four separate brackets in tournaments; copper, bronze, silver, and gold in a pool play system. Gold is the leading bracket, which is the overall champion of each tournament.

During a game, five matches are played, with a minimum of four players on a team, on hard courts.

- Men's doubles
- Women's doubles
- Men's singles
- Women's singles
- Mixed doubles

TOC players typically have an NTRP rating of 3.5 to 5.0 and played varsity high school tennis.

== Major tournaments ==
Outside the regular season, there are four major tournaments directly hosted by the USTA held seasonally. All four tournaments (Spring and Fall Invitationals, Sectional Championships, and the National Championship) feature free merchandise for the players, and professional photographers. The champions and runners-up of the Sectional and Invitational tournaments earn automatic bids to the National Championship, depending on the size of the section.

The four major tournaments are hosted at major or professional tennis centers at rotating venues nationwide.

=== Sectional Championships ===
The 15 USTA sections host a championship tournament where their respective sectional teams compete to win the trophy. The winners and runners-up get a bid to the National Championship.

=== Fall and Spring Invitationals ===
The Fall and Spring Invitationals are national invitational tournaments to which 64 schools from random sections are invited based on their seasonal record, with the winner of the tournament receiving an automatic bid to the National Championship. The tournaments were typically hosted in Surprise, Arizona and Cary, North Carolina, but the most recent ones were in Austin, Texas and Folsom, California. Due to the COVID-19 pandemic several 2020-2022 tournaments were cancelled.

Results by year:

Year	Spring champion	Fall champion
2024	Sacramento State	
2023	UCF	USC
2022	No Event	Wisconsin
2019	Georgia	Cornell
2018	Texas	Georgia
2017	Northern Arizona	Ohio State
2016	UC San Diego	Florida
2015	Michigan	Georgia
2014	UCLA	Florida
2013	USC	Florida
2012	Arizona	Duke
2011	UC San Diego	Michigan
2010	UC San Diego	Alabama

=== National Championship ===
The USTA Tennis on Campus National Championship is the pinnacle major tournament hosted in April. A pool of 64 schools throughout the nation which were the champions or runners-up of their Sectional Championship or the Fall/Spring Invitational earn automatic bids to Nationals. After the National Championship game is an awards ceremony.

The tournament lasts three days. Some years, the matches are livestreamed on YouTube with live commentary by the USTA.

==== Results by year ====
Below are the results of all the National Championships.

Year	Champion	Runner-up	Score	Location	Ref.
2026	UCLA	Georgia Tech	28-12	Fort Worth, Texas	
2025	California	Georgia Tech	30-16	Rome, Georgia	
2024	California	USC	25-17	Rome, Georgia	
2023	Virginia	Cal Poly	22-20	Surprise, Arizona	
2022	UCLA	California	28-22	Orlando, Florida	
2019	UCLA	California	23-22	Surprise, Arizona	
2018	Ohio State	North Carolina	27-13	Orlando, Florida	
2017	Michigan	UC Irvine	24-20	Orlando, Florida	
2016	Auburn	North Carolina	23-22	Cary, North Carolina	
2015	California	Minnesota	27-17	Cary, North Carolina	
2014	California	Florida	27-13	Surprise, Arizona	
2013	Georgia	Florida	26-24	Surprise, Arizona	
2012	California	Virginia	25-23	Cary, North Carolina	
2011	UCLA	Florida	30-19	Cary, North Carolina	
2010	California	Florida	30-14	Surprise, Arizona	
2009	Duke	Wisconsin	26-21	Surprise, Arizona	
2008	Texas	California	22-16	Cary, North Carolina	

Year	Champion
2007	Texas A&M
2006	Texas A&M
2005	Texas A&M
2004	Texas A&M
2003	Florida
2002	Texas A&M
2001	North Carolina
2000	North Carolina

==== Results by school ====
School	Titles	Years won	Years runner-up
California	6	2010, 2012, 2014, 2015, 2024, 2025	2008, 2019, 2022
Texas A&M	5	2002, 2004, 2005, 2006, 2007	—
UCLA	4	2011, 2019, 2022, 2026	—
North Carolina	2	2000, 2001	2016, 2018
Auburn	1	2016	—
Duke	1	2009	—
Florida	1	2003	2010, 2011, 2013, 2014
Georgia	1	2013	—
Michigan	1	2017	—
Ohio State	1	2018	—
Texas	1	2008	—
Virginia	1	2023	2012
