= Altitude training =

Athletic training at high elevations

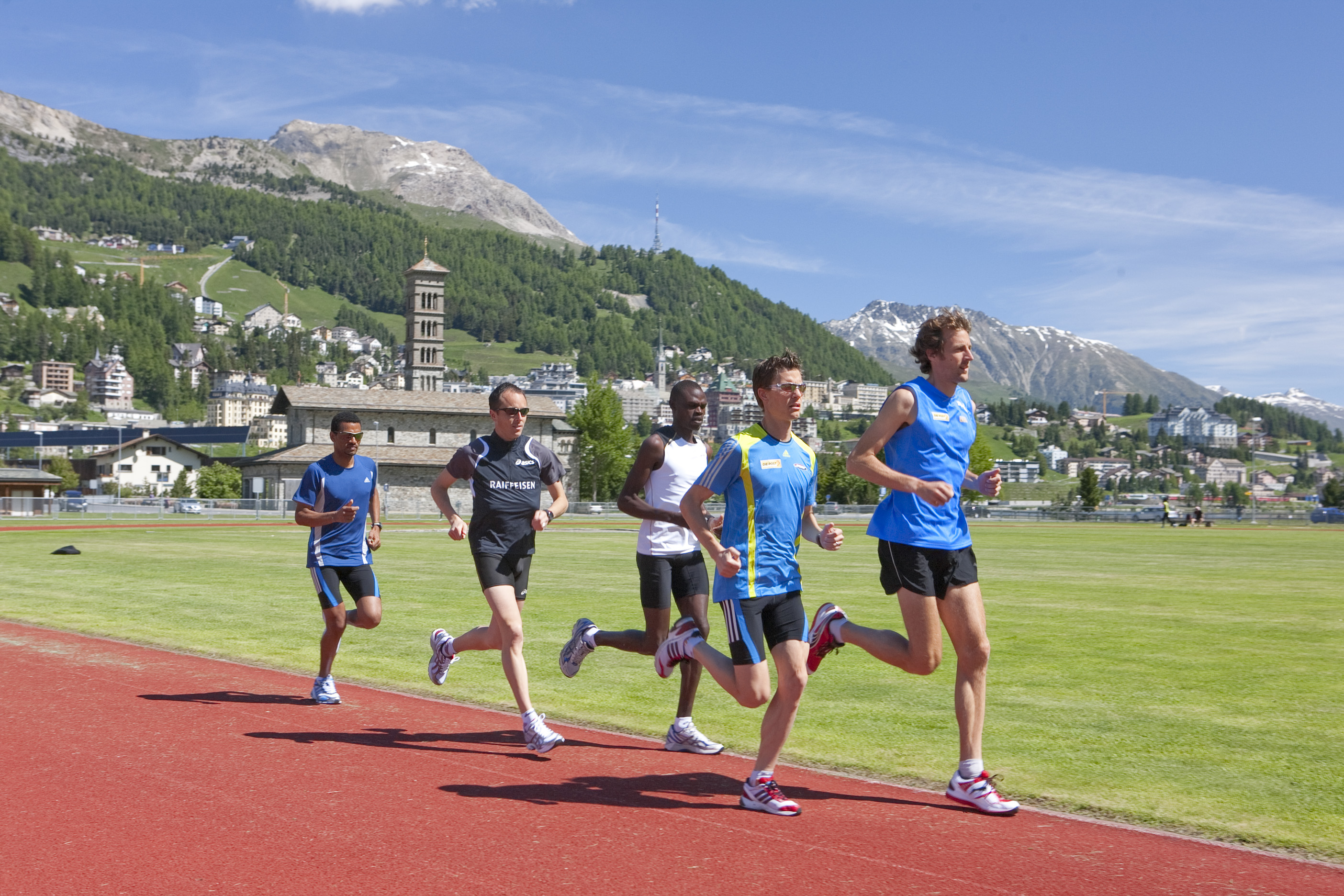
Altitude training in the Swiss Olympic Training Base in the Alps (elevation 1,856 m or 6,089 ft) in St. Moritz.

Altitude training is the practice by some endurance athletes of training for several weeks at high altitude, preferably over 2,400 metres (8,000 ft) above sea level, though more commonly at intermediate altitudes due to the shortage of suitable high-altitude locations. At intermediate altitudes, the air still contains approximately 20.9% oxygen, but the barometric pressure and thus the partial pressure of oxygen is reduced.

Depending on the protocols used, the body may acclimate to the relative lack of oxygen in one or more ways such as increasing the mass of red blood cells and hemoglobin, or altering muscle metabolism. Proponents claim that when such athletes travel to competitions at lower altitudes they will still have a higher concentration of red blood cells for 10–14 days, and this gives them a competitive advantage. Some athletes live permanently at high altitude, only returning to sea level to compete, but their training may suffer due to less available oxygen for workouts.

Altitude training can be simulated through use of an altitude simulation tent, altitude simulation room, or mask-based hypoxicator system where the barometric pressure is kept the same, but the oxygen content is reduced which also reduces the partial pressure of oxygen. Hypoventilation training, which consists of reducing the breathing frequency while exercising, can also mimic altitude training by significantly decreasing blood and muscle oxygenation.

== Background history ==
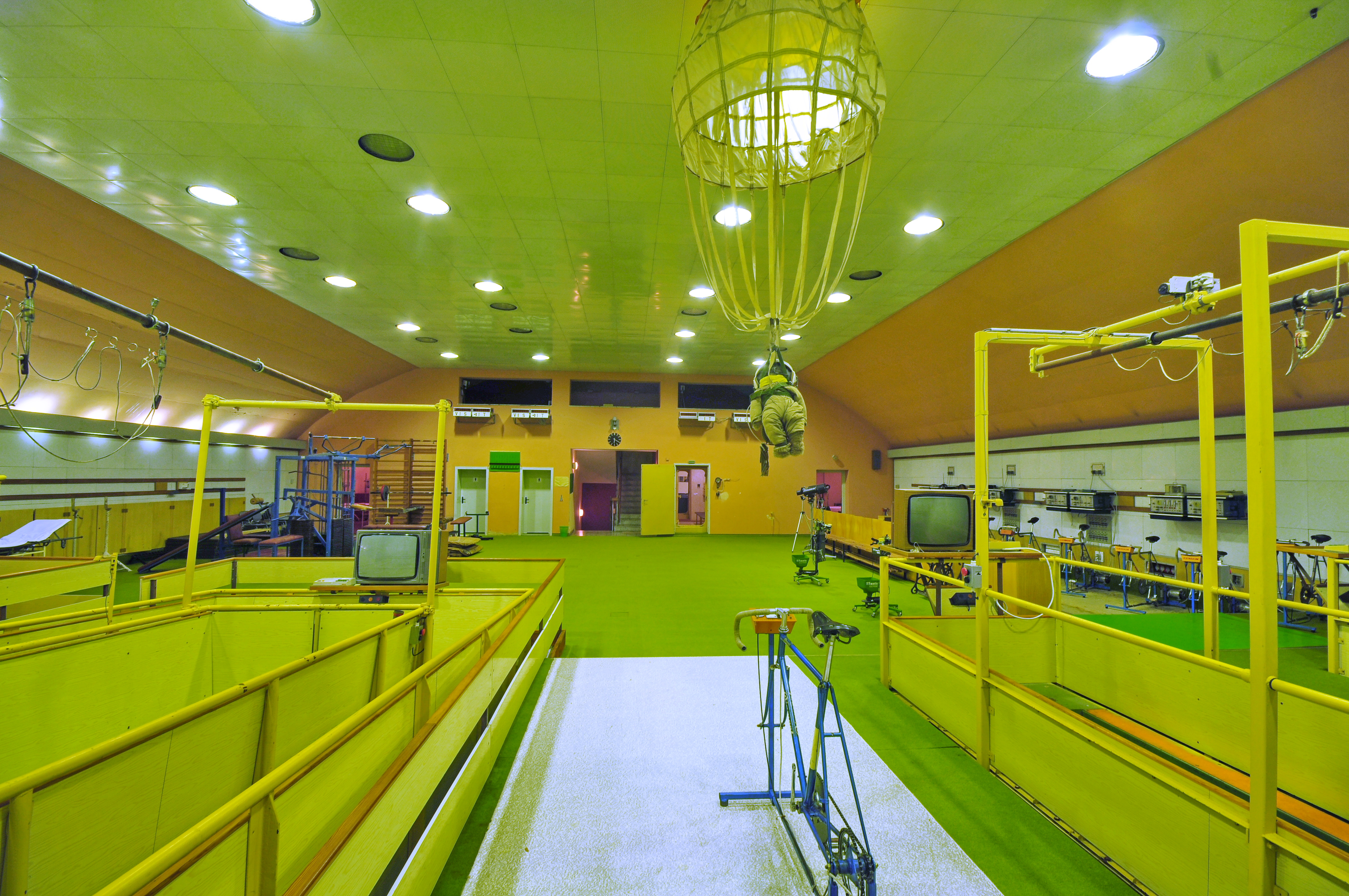
Altitude training in a low-pressure room in East Germany

The study of altitude training was heavily delved into during and after the 1968 Olympics, which took place in Mexico City, Mexico: elevation 2,240 metres (7,349 ft). It was during these Olympic Games that endurance events saw significant below-record finishes while anaerobic, sprint events broke all types of records. It was speculated prior to these events how the altitude might affect performances of these elite, world-class athletes and most of the conclusions drawn were equivalent to those hypothesized: that endurance events would suffer and that short events would not see significant negative changes. This was attributed not only to less resistance during movement—due to the less dense air—but also to the anaerobic nature of the sprint events. Ultimately, these games inspired investigations into altitude training from which unique training principles were developed with the aim of avoiding underperformance.

== Training regimens ==
Athletes or individuals who wish to gain a competitive edge for endurance events can take advantage of exercising at high altitude. High altitude is typically defined as any elevation above 1,500 metres (5,000 ft).

=== Live-high, train-low ===
One suggestion for optimizing adaptations and maintaining performance is the live-high, train-low principle. This training idea involves living at higher altitudes in order to experience the physiological adaptations that occur, such as increased erythropoietin (EPO) levels, increased red blood cell levels, and higher VO_{2} max, while maintaining the same exercise intensity during training at sea level. Due to the environmental differences at high altitude, it may be necessary to decrease the intensity of workouts. Studies examining the live-high, train-low theory have produced varied results, which may be dependent on a variety of factors such as individual variability, time spent at high altitude, and the type of training program. For example, it has been shown that athletes performing primarily anaerobic activity do not necessarily benefit from altitude training as they do not rely on oxygen to fuel their performances.

A non-training elevation of 2,100–2,500 metres (6,900–8,200 ft) and training at 1,250 metres (4,100 ft) or less has shown to be the optimal approach for altitude training. Good venues for live-high train-low include Mammoth Lakes, California; Flagstaff, Arizona; and the Sierra Nevada, near Granada in Spain.

Altitude training can produce increases in speed, strength, endurance, and recovery by maintaining altitude exposure for a significant period of time. A study using simulated altitude exposure for 18 days, yet training closer to sea-level, showed performance gains were still evident 15 days later.

Opponents of altitude training argue that an athlete's red blood cell concentration returns to normal levels within days of returning to sea level and that it is impossible to train at the same intensity that one could at sea level, reducing the training effect and wasting training time due to altitude sickness. Altitude training can produce slow recovery due to the stress of hypoxia. Exposure to extreme hypoxia at altitudes above 16,000 feet (5,000 m) can lead to considerable deterioration of skeletal muscle tissue. Five weeks at this altitude leads to a loss of muscle volume of the order of 10–15%.

=== Live-high, train-high ===
In the live-high, train-high regime, an athlete lives and trains at a desired altitude. The stimulus on the body is constant because the athlete is continuously in a hypoxic environment. Initially VO_{2} max drops considerably: by around 7% for every 1000 m above sea level. Athletes will no longer be able to metabolize as much oxygen as they would at sea level. Any given velocity must be performed at a higher relative intensity at altitude.

=== Repeated sprints in hypoxia ===
In repeated sprints in hypoxia (RSH), athletes run short sprints under 30 seconds as fast as they can. They experience incomplete recoveries in hypoxic conditions. The exercise to rest time ratio is less than 1:4, which means for every 30 second all out sprint, there is less than 120 seconds of rest.

When comparing RSH and repeated sprints in normoxia (RSN), studies show that RSH improved time to fatigue and power output. RSH and RSN groups were tested before and after a 4-week training period. Both groups initially completed 9–10 all-out sprints before total exhaustion. After the 4 week training period, the RSH group was able to complete 13 all out sprints before exhaustion and the RSN group only completed 9.

Possible physiological advantages from RSH include compensatory vasodilation and regeneration of phosphocreatine (PCr). The body's tissues have the ability to sense hypoxia and induce vasodilation. The higher blood flow helps the skeletal muscles maximize oxygen delivery. A greater level of PCr resynthesis augments the muscles power production during the initial stages of high-intensity exercise.

RSH is still a relatively new training method and is not fully understood.

=== Artificial altitude ===
Altitude simulation systems have enabled protocols that do not suffer from the tension between better altitude physiology and more intense workouts. Such simulated altitude systems can be utilized closer to competition if necessary.

In Finland, a scientist named Heikki Rusko has designed a "high-altitude house." The air inside the house, which is situated at sea level, is at normal pressure but modified to have a low concentration of oxygen, about 15.3% (below the 20.9% at sea level), which is roughly equivalent to the amount of oxygen available at the high altitudes often used for altitude training due to the reduced partial pressure of oxygen at altitude. Athletes live and sleep inside the house, but perform their training outside (at normal oxygen concentrations at 20.9%). Rusko's results show improvements of EPO and red-cell levels.

Artificial altitude can also be used for hypoxic exercise, where athletes train in an altitude simulator which mimics the conditions a high altitude environment. Athletes are able to perform high intensity training at lower velocities and thus produce less stress on the musculoskeletal system. This is beneficial to an athlete who had a musculoskeletal injury and is unable to apply large amounts of stress during exercise which would normally be needed to generate high intensity cardiovascular training. Hypoxia exposure for the time of exercise alone is not sufficient to induce changes in hematologic parameters. Hematocrit and hemoglobin concentrations remain in general unchanged. There are a number of companies who provide altitude training systems, most notably Hypoxico, Inc. who pioneered the artificial altitude training systems in the mid-1990s.

A South African scientist named Neil Stacey has proposed the opposite approach, using oxygen enrichment to provide a training environment with an oxygen partial pressure even higher than at sea level. This method is intended to increase training intensity.

== Principles and mechanisms ==
Altitude training works because of the difference in atmospheric pressure between sea level and high altitude. At sea level, air is denser and there are more molecules of gas per litre of air. Regardless of altitude, air is composed of 21% oxygen and 78% nitrogen. As the altitude increases, the pressure exerted by these gases decreases. Therefore, there are fewer molecules per unit volume: this causes a decrease in partial pressures of gases in the body, which elicits a variety of physiological changes in the body that occur at high altitude.

The physiological adaptation that is mainly responsible for the performance gains achieved from altitude training, is a subject of discussion among researchers. Some, including American researchers Ben Levine and Jim Stray-Gundersen, claim it is primarily the increased red blood cell volume.

Others, including Australian researcher Chris Gore, and New Zealand researcher Will Hopkins, dispute this and instead claim the gains are primarily a result of other adaptions such as a switch to a more economic mode of oxygen utilization.

=== Increased red blood cell volume ===
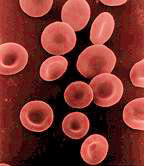
Human red blood cells

At high altitudes, there is a decrease in oxygen hemoglobin saturation. This hypoxic condition causes hypoxia-inducible factor 1 (HIF1) to become stable and stimulates the production of erythropoietin (EPO), a hormone secreted by the kidneys, EPO stimulates red blood cell production from bone marrow in order to increase hemoglobin saturation and oxygen delivery. Some athletes demonstrate a strong red blood cell response to altitude while others see little or no gain in red cell mass with chronic exposure. It is uncertain how long this adaptation takes because various studies have found different conclusions based on the amount of time spent at high altitudes.

While EPO occurs naturally in the body, it is also made synthetically to help treat patients with kidney failure and to treat patients during chemotherapy. Over the past thirty years, EPO has become frequently abused by competitive athletes through blood doping and injections in order to gain advantages in endurance events. Abuse of EPO, however, increases RBC counts beyond normal levels (polycythemia) and increases the viscosity of blood, possibly leading to hypertension and increasing the likelihood of a blood clot, heart attack or stroke. The natural secretion of EPO by the human kidneys can be increased by altitude training, but the body has limits on the amount of natural EPO that it will secrete, thus avoiding the harmful side effects of the illegal doping procedures.

=== Other mechanisms ===
Other mechanisms have been proposed to explain the utility of altitude training. Not all studies show a statistically significant increase in red blood cells from altitude training. One study explained the success by increasing the intensity of the training (due to increased heart and respiration rate). This improved training resulted in effects that lasted more than 15 days after return to sea level.

Another set of researchers claim that altitude training stimulates a more efficient use of oxygen by the muscles. This efficiency can arise from numerous other responses to altitude training, including angiogenesis, glucose transport, glycolysis, and pH regulation, each of which may partially explain improved endurance performance independent of a greater number of red blood cells. Furthermore, exercising at high altitude has been shown to cause muscular adjustments of selected gene transcripts, and improvement of mitochondrial properties in skeletal muscle.

In a study comparing rats active at high altitude versus rats active at sea level, with two sedentary control groups, it was observed that muscle fiber types changed according to homeostatic challenges which led to an increased metabolic efficiency during the beta oxidative cycle and citric acid cycle, showing an increased utilization of ATP for aerobic performance.

Due to the lower atmospheric pressure at high altitudes, the air pressure within the breathing system must be lower than it would be at low altitudes in order for inhalation to occur. Therefore, inhalation at high altitudes typically involves a relatively greater lowering of the thoracic diaphragm than at low altitudes.

== See also ==
- Effects of high altitude on humans
