= Hypoxia =

Hypoxia means a lower than normal level of oxygen, and may refer to:

== Reduced or insufficient oxygen ==
- Hypoxia (environmental), abnormally low oxygen content of a specific environment
  - Hypoxia in fish, responses of fish to hypoxia
- Hypoxia (medicine), abnormally low level of oxygen in the tissues
  - Autoerotic hypoxia or erotic asphyxiation, intentional restriction of oxygen to the brain for sexual arousal
  - Cerebral hypoxia, a reduced supply of oxygen to the brain
  - Diffusion hypoxia or Fink effect, a factor that influences the partial pressure of oxygen within the pulmonary alveoli
  - Histotoxic hypoxia, the inability of cells to take up or use oxygen from the bloodstream
  - Anemic hypoxia, blood is not able to take sufficient amount of oxygen due to Anemia
  - Hypoxemic hypoxia or hypoxemia, a deficiency of oxygen in arterial blood
  - Hypoxic hypoxia, a result of insufficient oxygen available to the lungs
  - Intrauterine hypoxia, when a fetus is deprived of an adequate supply of oxygen
  - Generalized hypoxia is hypoxia distributed amongst all tissues
  - Latent hypoxia is artificially raised oxygen concentration in the blood due to high ambient pressure and will reduce when the pressure is reduced to normal, associated with freediving blackout.
  - Pseudohypoxia, increased cytosolic ratio of free NADH to NAD^{+} in cells
  - Tumor hypoxia, the situation where tumor cells have been deprived of oxygen

== Music ==
- Hypoxia (album), by Kathryn Williams, 2015
- Hypoxia, an album by Projected, or the title song, 2022
- "Hypoxia", a song by Delerium from Spheres 2, 1994
- "Hypoxia", a song by Thomas Giles from Pulse, 2011
