= Latent hypoxia =

Lung gas and blood oxygen concentration sufficient to support consciousness only at depth

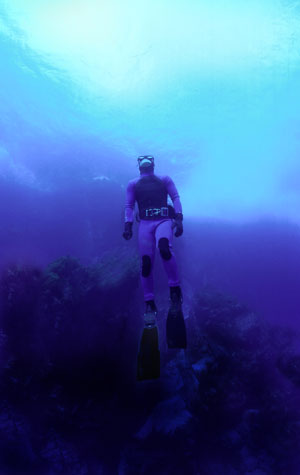
Latent hypoxia affects the diver on ascent

Latent hypoxia is a condition where the oxygen content of the lungs and arterial blood is sufficient to maintain consciousness at a raised ambient pressure, but not when the pressure is reduced to normal atmospheric pressure.

It usually occurs when a diver at depth has a lung gas and blood oxygen concentration that is sufficient to support consciousness at the pressure at that depth, but would be insufficient at surface pressure. This problem is associated with freediving blackout and the presence of hypoxic breathing gas mixtures in underwater breathing apparatus, particularly in diving rebreathers.

The term latent hypoxia strictly refers to the situation while the potential victim is at depth, still conscious, and not yet hypoxic, but is also loosely applied to the consequential blackout, which is a form of hypoxic blackout also referred to as blackout of ascent or deep water blackout, though deep water blackout is also used to refer to the final stage of nitrogen narcosis.

== Mechanism ==
Oxygen-Haemoglobin dissociation curves

The minimum tissue and vascular partial pressure of oxygen which will maintain consciousness is about 20 millimetres of mercury (27 mbar). This is equivalent to approximately 30 millimetres of mercury (40 mbar) in the lungs. Approximately 46 ml/min oxygen is required for brain function. This equates to a minimum arterial oxygen partial pressure (P_{a_{O_{2}}}) of 29 millimetres of mercury (39 mbar) at 868 ml/min cerebral flow.

An ascent blackout, or deep water blackout, is a loss of consciousness caused by cerebral hypoxia on ascending from a deep freedive (breath-hold dive), typically of ten metres or more when the swimmer does not necessarily experience an urgent need to breathe and has no other obvious medical condition that might have caused it, or from a dive using underwater breathing apparatus while using a breathing gas which has too low an oxygen fraction to support consciousness at the surface. Breath-hold victims typically black out close to the surface, sometimes even as they break surface, and have been seen to approach the surface without apparent distress only to sink away. Breath-hold victims are usually established practitioners of deep breath-hold diving, are fit, strong swimmers and have not experienced problems before. Blackout by this mechanism may occur even after surfacing from depth and breathing has commenced if the inhaled oxygen has not yet reached the brain and may be referred to as a surface blackout. Divers ascending using breathing apparatus typically ascend at slower ascent rates to avoid decompression sickness, and the depth at which consciousness is lost tends to follow the oxygen partial pressure of the breathing gas.

The partial pressure of oxygen in the air or other breathing gas mixture in the lungs controls the oxygen loading of blood. A critical P_{O_{2}} of 30 millimetres of mercury (40 mbar) in the lungs will sustain consciousness when breathing is resumed after a breath-hold dive. This is about 4% oxygen in the lungs and 45% oxygen saturation of the arterial blood. At 30 msw (4 bar), 2% by volume oxygen in the lung gas gives a P_{O_{2}} of 60 millimetres of mercury (80 mbar). At 10 msw (2 bar), for the same 2% oxygen, the P_{O_{2}} would be 30 millimetres of mercury (40 mbar), i.e. marginal. At the surface the same 2% oxygen drops to 15 millimetres of mercury (20 mbar), ignoring metabolic use.

== Consequences ==
The usual consequence, if the airway is not protected, is drowning. A breath-hold diver who has blacked out and has been promptly returned to the surface, will usually regain consciousness within seconds. While the diver is still unconscious underwater, they are at high risk of drowning. While unconscious the diver has lost voluntary bodily control, but still has protective reflexes that protect the airway. One of these is laryngospasm, which closes the larynx, preventing water from entering the lungs. If the diver has reached the surface, and the diver's face is kept above water, spontaneous breathing will often resume when the laryngospasm eventually relaxes. If, however, the diver is still underwater then water will enter the airway and may reach the lungs, which will cause complications even if resuscitation is successful, and secondary drowning is possible. The time between loss of consciousness and death varies considerably depending on a number of factors but can be as little as two and a half minutes.

If the diver's airway is protected by a full-face mask or diving helmet, the immediate risk is death by asphyxiation, which can occur within a few minutes of cessation of breathing. If the diver sinks and the pressure increases sufficiently, the gas may become capable of supporting consciousness again, but the problem of latent hypoxia remains until a higher oxygen content gas is provided. If the diver is on surface supply, a prompt switch of gases may be sufficient to restore consciousness, and this may also apply to a scuba diver if immediate and appropriate action is taken by another diver. Immediate surfacing of a hypoxic diver using underwater breathing apparatus presents the risk of decompression illness from lung barotrauma or decompression sickness, and the risk depends on the pressure exposure history of the diver.

== Scope of risk ==
Risk of latent hypoxia leading to blackout and further complications depends on the mode of diving in use.

Open circuit scuba and surface supplied diving using hypoxic breathing mixtures to avoid oxygen toxicity
Breathing mixtures for diving must limit partial pressure of oxygen to avoid the risk of acute oxygen toxicity, Recreational technical divers generally limit partial pressure of oxygen at the maximum planned depth of a dive to approximately 1.4 bar. When diving to depths below 57 m this requires the use of breathing gases with less than 21% oxygen. Gases with less than about 0.16 bar partial pressure of oxygen are considered insufficient to reliably maintain consciousness, so for depths below about 77 m the breathing gas which is safe to breathe at depth is not considered safe to breathe at the surface, and this effect increases with depth. At 130 m the richest gas mix acceptable would be about 10% oxygen. The depth at which this provides 0.16 bar P_{O_{2}} is about 6 m, so there is a high probability of loss of consciousness if this gas is used shallower than 6 m To reduce this risk, divers will use a travel gas which is suitable for the first part of descent, and switch to bottom gas when it is convenient and safe to breathe it. On the ascent, oxygen rich gases are valuable for accelerating decompression, so there is an additional reason to switch. Unless there is insufficient overlap in safe depth range for decompression gas and bottom gas, the same gas can be used for travel and decompression, which reduces the number of cylinders that must be carried. Failure to switch gas at the required depth can lead to blackout. Surface supplied divers may be required to work at maximum depth for longer and the partial pressure of oxygen may be limited to reduce pulmonary oxygen toxicity, so the discrepancy in oxygen content when surfacing may be greater, however in this case gas switching is controlled by the surface personnel, and the diver's airway is protected by the full-face mask or helmet, and the surface personnel can monitor the status of the diver on the voice communications system, so the overall risk is reduced in comparison with scuba.
Rebreather diving
During ascent at a rate where oxygen addition to the loop does not adequately compensate for partial pressure reduction due to decreasing ambient pressure, the oxygen concentration in the breathing loop can drop below the level required to support consciousness.
Freediving
During breath-hold diving there is no additional breathing gas available during the ascent. If the diver stays down long enough to use up the available oxygen to the extent where tissue concentration has dropped below a level sufficient to support consciousness at surface pressure, there is a very high risk of blackout before the surface can be reached.

== Management ==
=== Avoidance ===
- In open circuit diving using underwater breathing apparatus, the diver must switch to a breathing mixture with sufficient oxygen fraction to maintain an acceptable partial pressure during the next stage of ascent. This adjustment may be done as many times as is necessary and should be scheduled in the dive plan.
- Semi-closed circuit rebreathers may be flushed to increase oxygen fraction in the loop before and during ascent. This will ensure that the gas in the loop has not been partially deoxygenated by rebreathing, and has the highest available oxygen content. This is particularly relevant in passive addition rebreathers, as the expansion of loop gas during the ascent may overwhelm the capacity of the system to dump the appropriate amount of rebreathed gas from the loop.
- Closed circuit rebreathers can have oxygen added to the loop either manually or automatically, to maintain the desired oxygen partial pressure set-point during ascent.
- Freedivers can only avoid getting into a situation where latent hypoxia occurs. Once oxygen levels reach this point they will probably lose consciousness during the ascent and are at a high risk of drowning. Ensuring that they are positively buoyant in the event of blackout will give them a chance of recovery if they reach the surface.

=== Rescue ===
The diver who has lost consciousness due to latent hypoxia is already hypoxic, and should be brought to the surface as soon as possible, while protecting the airway. There are no contraindications to immediate surfacing for a breath-hold diver, and the mouth and nose may be blocked to prevent involuntary aspiration of water.

=== First aid and medical treatment ===
The first priority is ventilation at the earliest possible opportunity, and in many cases this may be sufficient. If ventilation with sufficient oxygenation is achieved promptly, and there has been no aspiration of water it is quite possible that no further treatment will be needed. If there is a delay the prognosis deteriorates rapidly. CPR may be necessary. Aspiration of water may require hospitalisation for observation, and if necessary, treatment for complications due to water in the lungs. Treatment is generally as for drowning. Supplementary oxygen is generally recommended.

== See also ==
- Drowning – Respiratory impairment caused by submersion in liquid
- Freediving blackout – Loss of consciousness caused by cerebral hypoxia towards the end of a breath-hold dive
- Hypoxia (medical) – Medical condition of lack of oxygen in the tissues
  - Generalized hypoxia – Medical condition of oxygen deprivation
