= Generalized hypoxia =

Medical condition of oxygen deprivation

- Other names: Arterial hypoxia
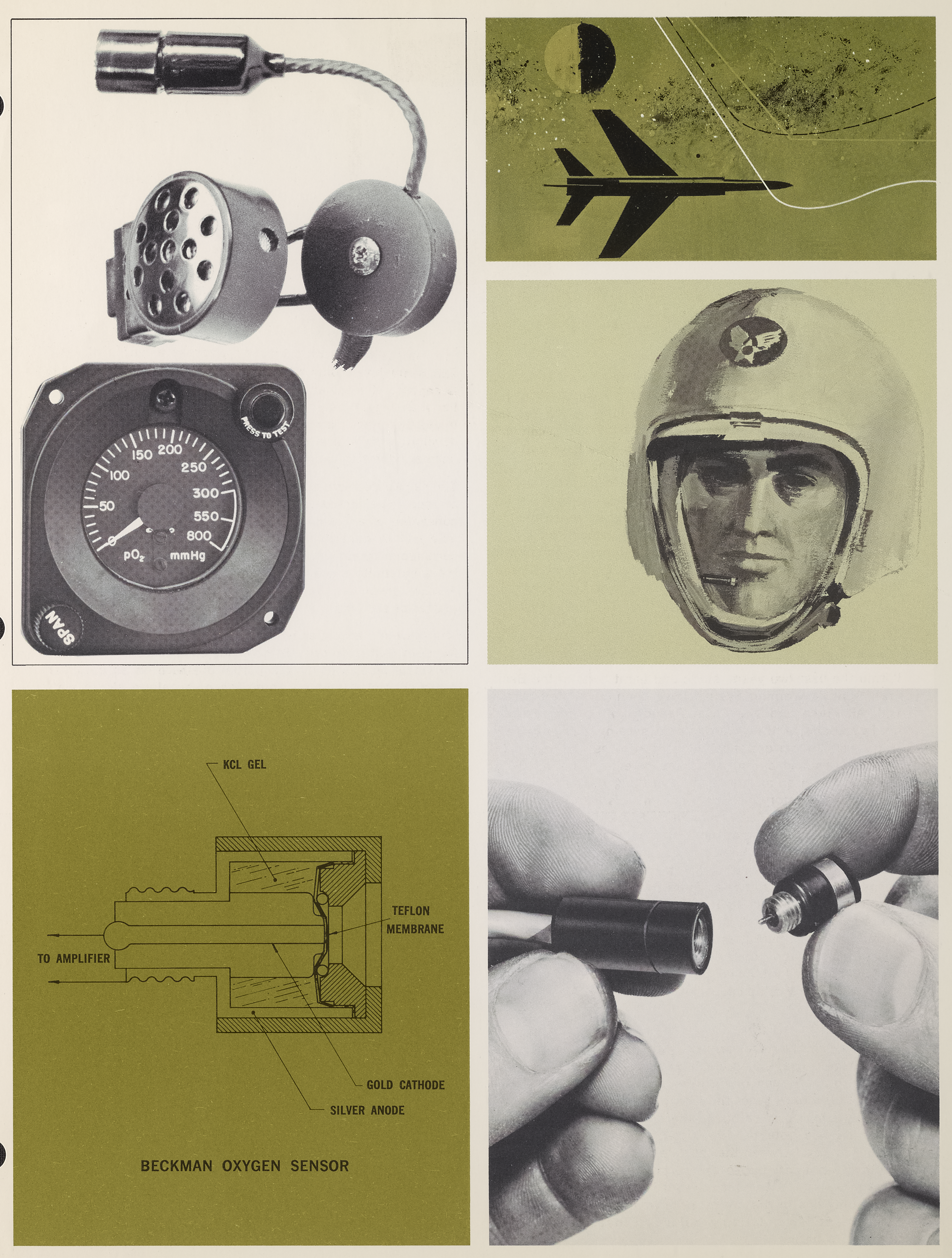
- Oxygen sensor for hypoxia warning system, 1963
- Specialty: Pulmonology

Generalized hypoxia is a medical condition in which the tissues of the body are deprived of the necessary levels of oxygen due to an insufficient supply of oxygen, which may be due to the composition or pressure of the breathing gas, decreased lung ventilation, or respiratory disease, any of which may cause a lower than normal oxygen content in the arterial blood, and consequently a reduced supply of oxygen to all tissues perfused by the arterial blood. This usage is distinct from localized hypoxia, in which only an associated group of tissues, usually with a common blood supply, are affected, usually due to an insufficient or reduced blood supply to those tissues. Generalized hypoxia is also used as a synonym for hypoxic hypoxia This is not to be confused with hypoxemia, which refers to low levels of oxygen in the blood, although the two conditions often occur simultaneously, since a decrease in blood oxygen typically corresponds to a decrease in oxygen in the surrounding tissue. However, hypoxia may be present without hypoxemia, and vice versa, as in the case of infarction. Several other classes of medical hypoxia exist.

== Causes ==
Hypoxia can result from various causes which can be categorised as: anemic hypoxia, cellular hypoxia, generalised, or hypoxic hypoxia, pulmonary hypoxia, stagnant hypoxia, increased oxygen consumption due to a hypermetabolic state, or any combination of these. The three fundamental causes of hypoxia at the tissue level are low oxygen content in the blood (hypoxemia), low perfusion of the tissue, and inability of the tissue to extract and use the oxygen in the blood. Generalised, or hypoxic hypoxia may be caused by:

- Hypoventilation – failure of the respiratory pump due to any cause (fatigue, barbiturate poisoning, pneumothorax, etc.)
- Low-inspired oxygen partial pressure, which may be caused by breathing air at low ambient pressures due to altitude, by breathing hypoxic breathing gas at an unsuitable depth, by breathing inadequately re-oxygenated recycled breathing gas from a rebreather, life-support system, or anesthetic machine, or hypoxia of ascent in freediving.
- Airway obstruction, choking, drowning.
- Abnormal pulmonary function
  - Chronic obstructive pulmonary disease (COPD)
  - Neuromuscular diseases or interstitial lung disease
- Malformed vascular system such as an anomalous coronary artery

=== Altitude effects ===
When breathing the ambient air at high altitudes (above 3048 metres/10,000 feet), the human body experiences altitude sickness and hypoxemia due to a low partial pressure of oxygen, decreasing the carriage of oxygen by hemoglobin.

- Above 3000 metres (10,000 feet) - ambient pressure 69.7kPa, about 14.6kPa partial pressure of oxygen – enough hypoxic stimulation to cause increased ventilation
- Above 3700 metres (12,000 feet) - 64.4kPa, about 13.52kPa P_{O_{2}} – first irritability appears
- Above 5500 metres (18,000 feet) - 50.6kPa, about 10.6kPa P_{O_{2}} – severe symptoms
- Above 7600 metres (25,000 feet) - ambient pressure 37.6kPa absolute, 7.9kPa partial pressure of oxygen – consciousness lost

While breathing pure oxygen at ambient pressure, from an oxygen cylinder or other source, the maximum altitude a human can tolerate while their body is at atmospheric pressure is 13,700 metres (45,000 feet), , where atmospheric pressure is about 14.7kPa. This is a function of the partial pressure of oxygen in the breathing gas, and is also dependent on level of exertion which affects the oxygen requirements of metabolism, cardiovascular fitness, and acclimatization to altitude which affects the available hemoglobin and can vary significantly between individuals.

== Signs and symptoms ==
- Cyanosis
- Headache
- Slowed or shallow breathing
- Decreased reaction time, disorientation, and uncoordinated movement.
- Impaired judgment, confusion, memory loss and cognitive problems.
- Euphoria or dissociation
- Visual impairment
- Lightheaded or dizzy sensation, vertigo
- Fatigue, Drowsiness or tiredness
- Shortness of breath
- Palpitations may occur in the initial phases. Later, the heart rate may reduce to a significant degree. In severe cases, abnormal heart rhythms may develop.
- Nausea and vomiting
- Initially raised blood pressure followed by lowered blood pressure as the condition progresses.
- Loss of consciousness
- Seizures or convulsions
- Coma and death
- Pupils unresponsive to light
- Paresthesia or "pins and needles"

== Treatment ==
Generalized hypoxia is a result of lack of oxygen, and can often be resolved by simply providing oxygen. Where there is no underlying pathology, provision of oxygen at normobaric partial pressure (about 0.21 bar) is usually sufficient to reverse minor symptoms. Where there is a pathology causing the hypoxia, treatment of the underlying pathology is often effective.

- Oxygen therapy and hyperbaric medicine can improve saturation of oxygen in the blood which will stop hypoxia if it is caused by hypoxemia, i.e. low levels of oxygen in the blood.
- Artificial ventilation may be required where the person is unable to breathe sufficiently unaided.
- Continuous positive airway pressure (CPAP) mask may be used to treat sleep apnea.
- Bilevel positive airway pressure (BIPAP) may be used to treat chronic obstructive pulmonary disease (COPD), and some kinds of sleep apnea.
- Supplemental oxygen by mask or nasal tubes may be provided to treat chronic hypoxia.
- Inhaled steroids that can dilate the airways may be used to treat asthma or other lung disease.
- Diuretics may be used to reduce edema in and around the lungs.

== Other types of medical hypoxia ==
- Hypoxemic hypoxia is a low oxygen tension in the arterial blood, due to the inability of the lungs to sufficiently oxygenate the blood. Causes include hypoventilation, impaired alveolar diffusion, and pulmonary shunting. This definition overlaps considerably with that of hypoxic hypoxia.
- Pulmonary hypoxia occurs when the lungs receive adequately oxygenated gas which does not reach the blood in sufficient quantities. It may be caused by:
  - Ventilation perfusion mismatch,
  - Pulmonary shunt
- Circulatory hypoxia, ischemic hypoxia or stagnant hypoxia may be caused by abnormally low blood flow to the lungs, which can occur during shock, cardiac arrest, severe congestive heart failure, or abdominal compartment syndrome, where the main dysfunction is in the cardiovascular system, causing a major reduction in perfusion. Arterial gas is adequately oygenated in the lungs, and the tissues are able to accept the oxygen available, but the flow rate to the tissues is insufficient. Venous oxygenation is particularly low.
- Anemic hypoxia or hypemic hypoxia is the lack of capacity of the blood to carry the normal level of oxygen. It can be caused by anemia or:
  - Carbon monoxide poisoning
  - Methemoglobinemia
- Cellular hypoxia occurs when the cells are unable to extract sufficient oxygen from normally oxygenated hemoglobin.
- Histotoxic hypoxia (Dysoxia) occurs when oxygen is transported to the tissues but they cannot use it effectively because the cells cannot extract oxygen from the blood. This is seen in cyanide poisoning.

== See also ==
- Hypoxemia – Abnormally low level of oxygen in the blood
- Hypoxia (medical) – Medical condition of lack of oxygen in the tissues
- Pulmonology – Study of respiratory diseases
- Oxygen
