= Pseudohypoxia =

Medical sign

Pseudohypoxia refers to a condition that mimics hypoxia, by having sufficient oxygen yet impaired mitochondrial respiration due to a deficiency of necessary co-enzymes, such as NAD^{+} and TPP. The increased cytosolic ratio of free NADH/NAD^{+} in cells (more NADH than NAD^{+}) can be caused by diabetic hyperglycemia and by excessive alcohol consumption. Low levels of TPP results from thiamine deficiency.

The insufficiency of available NAD^{+} or TPP produces symptoms similar to hypoxia (lack of oxygen), because they are needed primarily by the Krebs cycle for oxidative phosphorylation, and NAD^{+} to a lesser extent in anaerobic glycolysis. Oxidative phosphorylation and glycolysis are vital as these metabolic pathways produce ATP, which is the molecule that releases energy necessary for cells to function.

As there is not enough NAD^{+} or TPP for aerobic glycolysis nor fatty acid oxidation, anaerobic glycolysis is excessively used which turns glycogen and glucose into pyruvate, and then the pyruvate into lactate (fermentation). Fermentation also generates a small amount of NAD^{+} from NADH, but only enough to keep anaerobic glycolysis going. The excessive use of anaerobic glycolysis disrupts the lactate/pyruvate ratio causing lactic acidosis. The decreased pyruvate inhibits gluconeogenesis and increases release of fatty acids from adipose tissue. In the liver, the increase of plasma free fatty acids results in increased ketone production (which in excess causes ketoacidosis). The increased plasma free fatty acids, increased acetyl-CoA (accumulating from reduced Krebs cycle function), and increased NADH all contribute to increased fatty acid synthesis within the liver (which in excess causes fatty liver disease).

Pseudohypoxia also leads to hyperuricemia as elevated lactic acid inhibits uric acid secretion by the kidney; as well as the energy shortage from inhibited oxidative phosphorylation leads to increased turnover of adenosine nucleotides by the myokinase reaction and purine nucleotide cycle.

Research has shown that declining levels of NAD^{+} during aging cause pseudohypoxia, and that raising nuclear NAD^{+} in old mice reverses pseudohypoxia and metabolic dysfunction, thus reversing the aging process. It is expected that human NAD trials will begin in 2014.

Pseudohypoxia is a feature commonly noted in poorly-controlled diabetes.

== Reactions ==
In poorly controlled diabetes, as insulin is insufficient, glucose cannot enter the cell and remains high in the blood (hyperglycemia). The polyol pathway converts glucose into fructose, which can then enter the cell without requiring insulin. The oxidative damage done to cells in diabetes damages DNA and causes poly (ADP ribose) polymerases or PARPs to be activated, such as PARP1. Both processes reduce the available NAD^{+}.

In ethanol catabolism, ethanol is converted into acetate, consuming NAD^{+}. When alcohol is consumed in small quantities, the NADH/NAD^{+} ratio remains in balance enough for the acetyl-CoA (converted from acetate) to be used for oxidative phosphorylation. However, even moderate amounts of alcohol (1-2 drinks) results in more NADH than NAD^{+}, which inhibits oxidative phosphorylation. In chronic excessive alcohol consumption, the microsomal ethanol oxidizing system (MEOS) is used in addition to alcohol dehydrogenase.

=== Diabetes ===
==== Polyol pathway ====
D-glucose + NADPH → Sorbitol + NADP^{+} (catalyzed by aldose reductase)

Sorbitol + NAD^{+} → D-fructose + NADH (catalyzed by sorbitol dehydrogenase)

==== Poly (ADP-ribose) polymerase-1 ====
Protein + NAD^{+} → Protein + ADP-ribose + nicotinamide (catalyzed by PARP1)

=== Ethanol catabolism ===
==== Alcohol dehydrogenase ====
Ethanol + NAD^{+} → Acetaldehyde + NADH + H^{+} (catalyzed by alcohol dehydrogenase)

Acetaldehyde + NAD^{+} → Acetate + NADH + H^{+} (catalyzed by aldehyde dehydrogenase)

==== MEOS ====
Ethanol + NADPH + H^{+} + O_{2} → Acetaldehyde + NADP^{+} + 2H_{2}O (catalyzed by CYP2E1)

Acetaldehyde + NAD^{+} → Acetate + NADH + H^{+} (catalyzed by aldehyde dehydrogenase)

== See also ==
- Hypoxia (medical)
- Hypoxia (disambiguation) - list under Hypoxia (medical) e.g. Intrauterine hypoxia
- Bioenergetic systems - metabolic pathways of producing ATP
- Metabolic acidosis
