= Hypocapnia =

State of reduced carbon dioxide in the blood

- Carbon dioxide

Hypocapnia (from the Greek words ὑπό meaning below normal and καπνός kapnós meaning smoke), also known as hypocarbia, sometimes incorrectly called acapnia, is a state of reduced carbon dioxide in the blood. Hypocapnia usually results from deep or rapid breathing, known as hyperventilation.

Hypocapnia is the opposite of hypercapnia.

Short term hypocapnia does not usually have any adverse effects. It is sometimes used as lifesaving treatment for conditions such as neonatal pulmonary-artery hypertension and for people with severe intracranial hypertension. If the state of hypocapnia persists or is prolonged, adverse outcomes may occur.

== Effects ==
Even when marked, hypocapnia is normally well tolerated. Symptoms include tingling sensation (usually in the limbs), abnormal heartbeat, painful muscle cramps, and seizures. Acute hypocapnia causes hypocapnic alkalosis, which causes cerebral vasoconstriction leading to cerebral hypoxia, and this can cause transient dizziness, fainting, and anxiety. A low partial pressure of carbon dioxide in the blood also causes alkalosis (because CO_{2} is acidic in solution), leading to lowered plasma calcium ions (hypocalcaemia), causing increased nerve and muscle excitability. This explains the other common symptoms of hyperventilation—pins and needles, muscle cramps and tetany in the extremities, especially hands and feet.

Because the brain stem regulates breathing by monitoring the level of blood CO_{2} instead of O_{2}, hypocapnia can suppress breathing to the point of loss of consciousness from cerebral hypoxia, as exhibited in shallow water blackout.

Hypocapnia also results in bronchoconstriction in order to decrease ventilation. This mechanism is meant to counteract hyperventilation and decrease the amount of oxygen coming into the lungs as the body attempts to equalize the partial pressures of oxygen and carbon dioxide. Chemoreceptors in the body sense a change in partial pressures and pH (hydrogen ion concentration) in the blood. Chemoreceptors are responsible for signaling vasoconstriction, vasodilation, bronchoconstriction, and bronchodilation.

== Causes ==
The main physiologic causes of hypocapnia are related to hyperventilation. Hypocapnia is sometimes induced in the treatment of medical emergencies such as intracranial hypertension and hyperkalemia.

Self-induced hypocapnia through hyperventilation is the basis for the dangerous schoolyard fainting game. Deliberate hyperventilation has been used by underwater breath-hold divers for the purpose of extending dive time as it effectively reduces respiratory drive due to low CO_{2} levels. This allows one to break their standard limit of breath holding, at an increased risk of shallow water blackout (which is a significant cause of drownings). This risk is caused due to air hunger being reduced (due to low blood carbon dioxide levels) without an increase in oxygen levels. In fact, hypocapnia reduces the oxygen levels available to the brain due to the elevated affinity of oxygen to hemoglobin (Bohr effect), causing an elevated risk of cerebral hypoxia and loss of consciousness.

== Diagnosis ==
=== Neonatal infants ===
Monitoring the level of carbon dioxide in neonatal infants to ensure that the level is not too high (hypercapnia) or too low is important for improving outcomes for neonates in intensive care. Carbon dioxide can be monitored by taking a blood sample (arterial blood gas), through the breath (exhalation), and it can be measured continuously through the skin by using a minimally invasive transcutaneous device. An academic consensus on the most effective and safe approach for measuring carbon dioxide in newborn infants has not yet been established.

== See also ==
- Freediving blackout – Loss of consciousness caused by cerebral hypoxia towards the end of a breath-hold dive, where hyperventilation and the subsequent hypocapnia is a cause
- Hypercapnia – Abnormally high tissue carbon dioxide levels, increased level of carbon dioxide
- Hyperventilation syndrome – Medical condition involving hyperventilating, which is often associated with hypocapnia
- Carbaminohemoglobin – An adduct of carbon dioxide bound to hemoglobin, the form in which 23% carbon dioxide exists in the blood
- Carbamino – An adduct of carbon dioxide bound to the amino group of a free amino acid or protein
