= Solid stress =

The stresses, one of the physical hallmarks of cancer, is exerted by the solid components of a tissue and accumulated within solid structural components (i.e., cells, collagen, and hyaluronan) during growth and progression.

Solid stress in tumors is a residual stress that is elevated because of abnormal tumor growth and resistance to growth from the surrounding normal tissues or from within the tumors. Solid stress, independent of the interstitial fluid pressure, induces hypoxia and impedes drug delivery by compressing blood vessels in tumors. Solid stress is heterogeneous in tumors with tensile stresses distributed more at the periphery of the tumor, and compressive stresses more at the tumor core.
