= Histotoxic hypoxia =

Medical condition in which cells cannot use oxygen

Histotoxic hypoxia (also called histoxic hypoxia) is the inability of cells to take up or use oxygen from the bloodstream, despite physiologically normal delivery of oxygen to such cells and tissues. Histotoxic hypoxia results from tissue poisoning, such as that caused by cyanide (which acts by inhibiting cytochrome oxidase) and certain other poisons like hydrogen sulfide (byproduct of sewage and used in leather tanning).

== Causes ==
Histotoxic hypoxia refers to a reduction in ATP production by the mitochondria due to a defect in the cellular usage of oxygen.

=== Cyanide ===
An example of histotoxic hypoxia is cyanide poisoning. There is a profound drop in tissue oxygen consumption since the reaction of oxygen with cytochrome oxidase is blocked by the presence of cyanide. Cyanide binds to the ferric ion on cytochrome oxidase a_{3} and prevents the fourth and final reaction in the electron transport chain. This completely stops oxidative phosphorylation and prevents the mitochondria from producing ATP. There are other chemicals that interrupt the mitochondrial electron transport chain (e.g., rotenone, antimycin A) and produce effects on tissue oxygenation similar to that of cyanide. Oxygen extraction decreases in parallel with the lower oxygen consumption, with a resulting increase in venous oxygen content and PvO2. Although cyanide stimulates the peripheral respiratory chemoreceptors, increasing the inspired oxygen fraction is not helpful, since there is already an adequate amount of oxygen which the poisoned cells cannot use.

==== Treatments ====
Cyanide antidote kit is a widely used method in treating cyanide induced histotoxic hypoxia. It consists of three different parts that are administered one after the other. The three parts are amyl nitrite, sodium nitrite, and sodium thiosulfate. The nitrites act with hemoglobin to form methemoglobin which binds cyanide. Cyanide has a preference to the ferric ion on methemoglobin over the ferric ion on cytochrome oxidase a_{3} and causes cyanide to be drawn out of the mitochondria. This causes the mitochondria to produce ATP again and stop histotoxic hypoxia.

=== Ischemia ===
Histotoxic hypoxia can be a consequence of ischemia in the case of stroke or inflammation. In the case of inflammation, neuro-inflammatory diseases like Alzheimer's disease, Parkinson's disease and Multiple Sclerosis can all lead to histotoxic hypoxia. During a stroke, there is an interruption in the blood supply followed by reperfusion which leads to histotoxic hypoxia because of an accumulation of reactive oxygen species (ROS). In the case of inflammatory diseases, histotoxic hypoxia can also be triggered by ROS from mitochondrial damage in the active lesions of chronic multiple sclerosis. Inflammatory mediators such as heme oxygynase-1(HO-1) can result in histotoxic hypoxia when they are released in excess and cause the sequestration of iron as in the cases of Alzheimer's disease, Parkinson's disease and Multiple Sclerosis.

== See also ==
- Hypoxia
