= Anomalous left coronary artery from the pulmonary artery =

- Other names: Bland-White-Garland syndrome
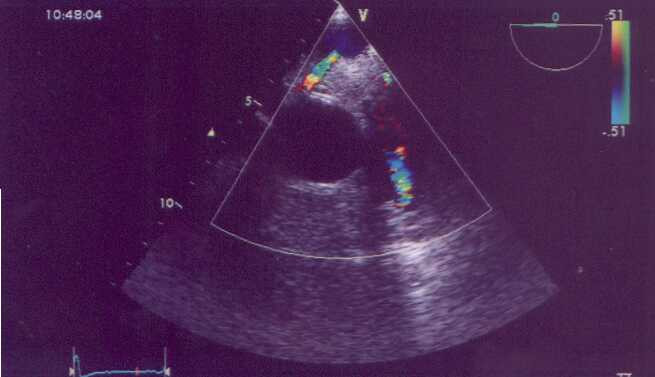
- Possible communication between left coronary artery and pulmonary artery in a 45-year-old woman with Bland-White-Garland syndrome.
- Specialty: Cardiology

Anomalous left coronary artery from the pulmonary artery (ALCAPA, Bland-White-Garland syndrome or White-Garland syndrome) is a rare congenital anomaly occurring in approximately 1 in 300,000 liveborn children. The diagnosis comprises between 0.24 and 0.46% of all cases of congenital heart disease. The anomalous left coronary artery (LCA) usually arises from the pulmonary artery instead of the aortic sinus. In fetal life, the high pressure in the pulmonic artery and the fetal shunts enable oxygen-rich blood to flow in the LCA. By the time of birth, the pressure will decrease in the pulmonic artery and the child will have a postnatal circulation. The myocardium, which is supplied by the LCA, will therefore be dependent on collateral blood flow from the other coronary arteries, mainly the RCA. Because the pressure in RCA exceeds the pressure in LCA a collateral circulation will increase. This situation ultimately can lead to blood flowing from the RCA into the LCA retrograde and into the pulmonary artery, thus forming a left-to-right shunt.

== Signs and symptoms ==
The development of symptoms in ALCAPA depends heavily on the amount of collateral development. When few collaterals are present, the myocardium will not get enough oxygen and will become ischemic. The symptoms in an infant with ALCAPA include signs of heart failure such as dyspnea and tachypnea, but sometimes the development is more subtle and the first sign of ischemia can be crying during feeding, sweating, failure to thrive and irritability. Approximately 90% of patients die within the first year if left untreated. Patients having a significant collateral circulation can live to adulthood in rare cases, but often insufficient circulation will cause them to develop chronic ischemia, having a risk for sudden cardiac arrest, heart failure or malignant arrhythmia. The mechanism of patient survival to adulthood is not fully understood.

== Diagnosis ==
Historically ALCAPA was diagnosed with conventional angiography. Today echocardiography is easily used. It can provide direct visualisation of the anomalous coronary artery and other associated structural abnormalities, and it can also assess myocardial function. The use of pulse and color-flow doppler can sometimes visualise reversal flow in the pulmonic artery. Other non-invasive methods used are computed tomography (CT) as well as magnetic resonance imaging (MRI), which enable a direct visualisation of the arteries as well as the myocardial viability.

== Surgery ==
Surgery is indicated in all patients with ALCAPA independent of symptoms, since reconnection of the anomalous left coronary artery to the aortic root is crucial to the perfusion of the myocardium dependent on that vessel. Several surgical techniques have been described in ALCAPA repair, including reimplantation of the left coronary artery into the aorta, creation of an intra-pulmonary buffer (Takeuchi procedure), and bypass grafting. Establishment of a dual coronary system is the preferred method and if possible reimplantation of the artery is the approach of choice. Surgery on the mitral valve at the same time as ALCAPA correction is controversial. Even if surgery is carried out in adulthood, reestablishment of a two-coronary system can make malignant arrhythmia disappear.

== Outcome and management ==
No difference in long-term mortality or left ventricle function has been shown between the different techniques to re-establish a two-coronary system. An exception is the ligation of the anomalous left coronary artery, which has a higher mortality. The development of surgical techniques and restoring of two-artery circulation has dramatically increased survival. Close long-term follow-up of these patients is necessary, to diagnose a recurrent left ventricle dysfunction, but also to better understand the natural evolution of a corrected heart.
