= Freediving blackout =

Loss of consciousness caused by cerebral hypoxia towards the end of a breath-hold dive

Freediving blackout, breath-hold blackout, or apnea blackout is a class of hypoxic blackout, a loss of consciousness caused by cerebral hypoxia towards the end of a breath-hold (freedive or dynamic apnea) dive, when the swimmer does not necessarily experience an urgent need to breathe and has no other obvious medical condition that might have caused it. It can be provoked by hyperventilating just before a dive, be a consequence of the pressure reduction on ascent, or a combination of the two. Victims are often established practitioners of breath-hold diving, are fit, strong swimmers and have not experienced problems before. Blackout may also be referred to as a syncope or fainting.

Divers and swimmers who black out or grey out underwater during a dive will usually drown unless rescued and resuscitated within a short time. Freediving blackout has a high fatality rate, and mostly involves males younger than 40 years, but is generally avoidable. Risk cannot be quantified, but is clearly increased by any level of hyperventilation.

Freediving blackout can occur on any dive profile - at constant depth, on an ascent from depth, or at the surface following ascent from depth - and may be described by a number of terms, depending on the dive profile and depth at which consciousness is lost. Blackout during a shallow dive differs from blackout during ascent from a deep dive, in that blackout during ascent is precipitated by depressurisation on ascent from depth, while blackout in consistently shallow water is a consequence of hypocapnia following hyperventilation.

== Terminology ==
Different types of freediving blackout have become known under a variety of names. These include:

ascent blackout
blackout on ascent
hypoxia of ascent
Loss of consciousness which occurs as the surface is approached, or even at the surface, following a deep breath-hold dive (generally over ten metres) and typically involving free-divers practicing dynamic apnea depth diving, usually at sea. The mechanism of ascent blackout is hypoxia, arising from the rapid drop in the partial pressure of oxygen in the lungs on ascent as the ambient pressure drops and the gas in the lungs expands to surface volume. See latent hypoxia.
constant depth blackout
constant pressure blackout
isobaric blackout
A specific form of hypoxic blackout which occurs where all phases of the dive have taken place in shallow water; hence, depressurisation is not a significant factor. This is often referred to by breath-hold divers as shallow water blackout. The mechanism for this type of blackout is hypoxia expedited by hypocapnia caused by voluntary hyperventilation before the dive. These blackouts typically occur in swimming pools and are probably driven only by excessive hyperventilation, with no significant influence of pressure change.
deep water blackout
An alternative term for blackout on ascent when used by free divers. As it is also used for other purposes, ascent blackout is the less ambiguous option.
hyperventilation-induced blackout
The recommended term for cases where hyperventilation is known, or suspected, to have been a contributing factor in either shallow water blackout or deep water blackout.
latent hypoxia
The precursor to blackout on ascent, where the partial pressure of oxygen remains sufficient to maintain consciousness, but only at depth, under pressure, and is already insufficient to maintain consciousness at the shallower depths that must be encountered on ascent.
shallow water blackout
A loss of consciousness during a dive associated with blackout at a shallow depth. The term is used for several different mechanisms, depending on context; therefore, this term may often lead to confusion.
1. Blackout which occurs when all phases of the dive have taken place in shallow water (i.e., where depressurisation is not a significant factor) and typically involves dynamic apnea distance swimmers, usually in a swimming pool. The mechanism for this type of shallow water blackout is hypoxia expedited by hypocapnia caused by voluntary hyperventilation before the dive. Blackouts which occur in swimming pools are probably driven only by excessive hyperventilation, with no significant influence of pressure change. This can also be described as a constant pressure blackout or isobaric blackout.
2. A loss of consciousness caused by cerebral hypoxia at the end of a deep breath-hold dive, during the latter part of the ascent or immediately after surfacing due to lowered oxygen partial pressure, caused by reduction in ambient pressure. Blackout in the shallow stage of ascent from deep free dives is also sometimes called deep water blackout and ascent blackout, which can be confusing.
3. Used in diving but not in free diving, loss of consciousness while ascending on a rebreather, due to sudden drop of oxygen partial pressure in the breathing loop, usually associated with manual CCR and SCR. As there is a large overlap between the research communities studying the physiology of freediving and other modes of underwater diving, this usage can also lead to confusion.
surface blackout
A possible final stage of blackout on ascent that occurs when a diver with low levels of circulating oxygen has surfaced and begun breathing, yet blacks out before the inhaled oxygen has had time to reach the brain.
underwater blackout syndrome
hypoxic blackout
A loss of consciousness during a breath-hold submersion preceded by hyperventilation, where alternative causes of blackout have been excluded.

In this article, constant pressure blackout and shallow water blackout refers to blackouts in shallow water following hyperventilation, and ascent blackout and deep water blackout refers to blackout on ascent from depth. Some free divers consider blackout on ascent to be a special condition or subset of shallow water blackout but the primary underlying mechanisms differ. This confusion is exacerbated by the fact that, in the case of blackout on ascent, hyperventilation induced hypocapnia also may be a contributory factor even if depressurisation on ascent is the actual precipitator.

Some scuba diving curricula may apply the terms shallow-water blackout and deep-water blackout differently; deep-water blackout may be applied to the final stage of nitrogen narcosis while shallow water blackout may be applied to a blackout from a deep free dive. Nitrogen narcosis does not normally apply to freediving, as free-divers start and finish the dive with only a single lungful of air, and it has long been assumed that free divers are not exposed to the necessary pressure for long enough to absorb sufficient nitrogen. Where these terms are used in this manner, there is usually little or no discussion of the phenomenon of blackouts not involving depressurisation, and the cause may be variously attributed to either depressurisation, hypocapnia or both. This problem may stem from the origin of the term latent hypoxia in the context of a string of fatal, shallow water accidents with early military, closed-circuit rebreather apparatus prior to the development of effective oxygen partial pressure measurement. In the very different context of dynamic apnea sports, careful consideration of terms is needed to avoid potentially dangerous confusion between two phenomena that actually have different characteristics, mechanisms and prevention measures. The application of the term shallow water blackout to deep dives, and its subsequent association with extreme sports, has tended to mislead many practitioners of static apnea and dynamic apnea distance diving into thinking that it does not apply to them, even though isobaric shallow water blackout kills swimmers every year, often in shallow swimming pools.

The CDC has identified a consistent set of voluntary behaviors associated with unintentional drowning, known as dangerous underwater breath-holding behaviors; these are intentional hyperventilation, static apnea, and hypoxic training.

Other terms generally associated with freediving blackout include:

hyperventilation
Breathing more gas than is necessary to compensate for metabolic consumption. There is a continuum between normal breathing and hyperventilation: "deep breathing", "cleansing breaths", or "workup breaths" are just different names for hyperventilation. Some effects of hyperventilation develop early in this process. There is a difference between filling the lungs with a deep breath to maximize available gas just before the dive, versus taking deep breaths in succession; the latter will deplete carbon dioxide, without much effect on oxygen supply. This effect is illustrated in the graphs in section Shallow water blackout
recovery breathing
Also known as hook breathing. This is a technique used by free divers upon surfacing to reduce the risk of surface blackout. A partial exhalation is made, followed by a quick inhalation; then the diver closes the airway and pressurises for a few seconds as if about to cough. This behavior is repeated a few times over the first 30 seconds or so on the surface. The aim is to keep thoracic pressure slightly raised, in order to artificially raise arterial oxygen partial pressure or prevent it from dropping in the critical seconds until newly oxygenated blood can reach the brain and thereby prevent surface blackout. This is the same technique used by pilots during high-g maneuvers, as well as by mountaineers at high altitude.
lung packing
Technically known as glossopharyngeal insufflation, lung packing or buccal pumping is a technique for inflating the lungs beyond their normal isobaric total capacity, which is used to delay the compression of the lungs at by hydrostatic pressure, allowing a greater depth to be reached, and providing a slightly larger reserve of oxygen for the dive. After full normal inspiration, the diver fills the mouth with air, with the glottis closed, then opens the glottis and forces the air from the mouth into the lung, then closes the glottis to hold in the air. This is repeated several times. Lung packing can increase the volume of air in the lungs by up to 50% of vital capacity. The pressure induced will reduce the volume of blood in the chest, which will increase the space available for air. The gas in the lungs is also compressed. Pressures of about 75 millimetres of mercury (100 mbar) have been reported. Lung packing has been associated with short-term haemodynamic instabilities, which might contribute toward triggering blackout.
laryngospasm
Laryngospasm is an involuntary muscular contraction (spasm) of the vocal folds. The condition typically lasts less than 60 seconds, but in some cases may last 20-30 minutes and causes a partial blocking of inspiration of breath, while expiration of breath remains easier. It is a protective reflex against pulmonary aspiration and may be triggered when the vocal cords, or the area of the trachea below the vocal folds, detect the entry of water, mucus, blood, or another substance. In conscious subjects, there is some voluntary control, which allows relatively quick recovery of the airway. Laryngospasm will relax with increased hypoxia, but the blood oxygen partial pressure at which this will occur is unknown (2006) and is probably variable. Laryngospasm itself is not usually fatal if sufficient oxygen is available when the spasm relaxes.

== Mechanisms ==
Oxygen-Haemoglobin dissociation curves

The minimum tissue and venous partial pressure of oxygen which will maintain consciousness is about 20 millimetres of mercury (27 mbar). This is equivalent to approximately 30 millimetres of mercury (40 mbar) in the lungs. Approximately 46 ml/min oxygen is required for brain function. This equates to a minimum arterial ppO_{2} of 29 millimetres of mercury (39 mbar) at 868 ml/min cerebral flow.

Hyperventilation depletes the blood of carbon dioxide (hypocapnia), which causes respiratory alkalosis (increased pH) and a leftward shift in the oxygen–hemoglobin dissociation curve. This results in a lower venous partial pressure of oxygen, which worsens hypoxia. A normally ventilated breath-hold usually breaks (from CO_{2}) with over 90% saturation, which is far from hypoxia. Hypoxia produces a respiratory drive, but it is not as strong as the hypercapnic respiratory drive. This has been studied in altitude medicine, where hypoxia occurs without hypercapnia due to the low ambient pressure. The balance between the hypercapnic and hypoxic respiratory drives has genetic variability and can be modified by hypoxic training. These variations imply that predictive risk cannot be reliably estimated, but pre-dive hyperventilation carries definite risks.

There are three different mechanisms behind blackouts in freediving:

1. Duration-induced hypoxia occurs when the breath is held long enough for metabolic activity to reduce the oxygen partial pressure sufficiently to cause loss of consciousness. This is accelerated by exertion, which uses oxygen faster, or hyperventilation, which reduces the carbon dioxide level in the blood. This in turn may:
  - increase the oxygen-haemoglobin affinity, thus reducing availability of oxygen to brain tissue towards the end of the dive (Bohr effect).
  - suppress the urge to breathe, making it easier to hold the breath to the point of blackout. This can happen at any depth.
2. Ischaemic hypoxia is caused by reduced blood flow to the brain arising from cerebral vasoconstriction brought on by low carbon dioxide following hyperventilation, or increased pressure on the heart as a consequence of glossopharangeal insufflation (lung packing) which can reduce blood circulation in general, or both. If the brain uses more oxygen than is available in the blood supply, the cerebral oxygen partial pressure may drop below the level required to sustain consciousness. This type of blackout is likely to occur early in the dive.
3. Ascent-induced hypoxia is caused by a drop in oxygen partial pressure as ambient pressure is reduced on ascent. The oxygen partial pressure at depth, under pressure, may be sufficient to maintain consciousness but only at that depth and not at the reduced pressures in the shallower waters above or at the surface.

The mechanism for blackout on ascent differs from hyperventilation induced hypocapnia expedited blackouts and does not necessarily follow hyperventilation. However, hyperventilation will exacerbate the risk and there is no clear line between them. Shallow water blackouts can happen in extremely shallow water, even on dry land following hyperventilation and apnoea, but the effect becomes much more dangerous in the ascent stage of a deep free dive. There is considerable confusion surrounding the terms shallow and deep water blackout: they have been used to refer to different things, and may be used interchangeably in different water sports circles. For example, the term shallow water blackout has been used to describe blackout on ascent, because the blackout usually occurs when the diver ascends to a shallow depth. For the purposes of this article there are two separate phenomena: shallow water blackout and blackout on ascent.

=== Shallow water blackout ===
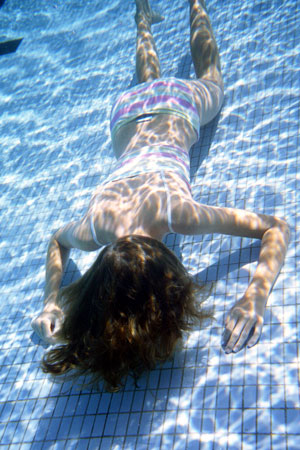
Staged image showing how victims may black out quietly underwater, often going unnoticed.

Otherwise unexplained underwater blackouts have been associated with the practice of hyperventilation. Survivors of shallow water blackouts often report using hyperventilation as a technique to increase the time they can spend underwater. Hyperventilation, or over-breathing, involves breathing faster and/or deeper than the body naturally demands, and is often used by divers in the mistaken belief that this will increase oxygen saturation. Although this appears to be intuitively true, the breathing rate dictated by the body alone under normal circumstances already leads to 98–99% oxygen saturation of the arterial blood, and the effect of over-breathing on the oxygen intake is minor. What instead happens is that divers are extending their dive by postponing the body's natural breathing mechanism, not by increasing oxygen load.

This mechanism begins with the primary urge to breathe, triggered by rising carbon dioxide (CO_{2}) levels in the bloodstream. Carbon dioxide builds up in the bloodstream when oxygen is metabolized and it needs to be expelled as a waste product. The body detects carbon dioxide levels very accurately and relies on this as the primary trigger to control breathing. Hyperventilation artificially depletes the resting concentration of carbon dioxide, causing a low blood carbon dioxide condition called hypocapnia. Hypocapnia reduces the reflexive respiratory drive, allowing the delay of breathing and leaving the diver susceptible to loss of consciousness from hypoxia. For most healthy people, the first sign of low oxygen levels is a greyout or unconsciousness: there is no bodily sensation that warns a diver of an impending blackout.

Significantly, victims often drown quietly underwater, without alerting anyone to the fact that there is a problem, and are typically found on the bottom as shown in the staged image above. Survivors of shallow water blackout are typically puzzled as to why they blacked out. Pool life guards are trained to scan the bottom for the situation shown.

The diagram above shows the O_{2} and CO_{2} levels (partial pressures) in the blood over the duration of a safe dive. Stabilisation of O_{2} and CO_{2} levels through normal breathing are shown on the left. The dive ends safely when the diver is forced to the surface by an urgent need to breathe.

In the diagram above hyperventilation prior to the dive has artificially depressed CO_{2} levels (partial pressures) without elevating the O_{2} level. This pre-dive state is likely to result in shallow water blackout. The O_{2} level drops into the diver's blackout zone before the CO_{2} can rise enough to force the diver to resurface to breathe. The dive length is extended but the diver may not survive.

Breath-hold divers who hyperventilate before a dive increase their risk of drowning. Many drownings unattributed to any other cause result from shallow water blackout and could be avoided if this mechanism was properly understood and the practice eliminated. Shallow water blackout can be avoided by ensuring that carbon dioxide levels in the body are normally balanced prior to diving and that appropriate safety measures are in place.

A high level of hypocapnia is readily identifiable, as it causes dizziness and tingling of the fingers. These extreme symptoms are caused by the increase of blood pH (alkalosis) following the reduction of carbon dioxide, which acts to lower the pH of the blood. The absence of any symptoms of hypocapnia is not an indication that the diver's carbon dioxide is within safe limits and cannot be taken as an indication that it is therefore safe to dive. Conservative breath-hold divers who do hyperventilate, but stop before the onset of these symptoms, are likely to be already hypocapnic without knowing it.

The urge to breathe is triggered by rising carbon dioxide levels in the blood and not by the reduction of oxygen. The body can detect low levels of oxygen, but this is not normally perceptible prior to blackout. Persistently elevated levels of carbon dioxide in the blood, hypercapnia (the opposite to hypocapnia), tend to desensitise the body to carbon dioxide, in which case the body may come to rely on the oxygen level in the blood to maintain respiratory drive. This is illustrated in the scenario of type II respiratory failure. However, in a normal healthy person, there is no subjective awareness of low oxygen levels.

=== Ascent blackout ===
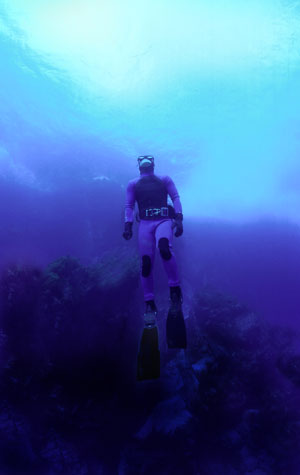
Latent hypoxia hits on ascent

An ascent blackout, or deep water blackout, is a loss of consciousness caused by cerebral hypoxia on ascending from a deep free dive or breath-hold dive, typically of ten metres or more, when the swimmer does not necessarily experience an urgent need to breathe and has no other obvious medical condition that might have caused it. Victims typically black out close to the surface, usually within the top three metres, sometimes even as they break surface, and have often been seen to approach the surface without apparent distress only to sink away. It is quite rare for blackouts to occur while at the bottom or in the early stages of ascent; divers who drown in these stages are usually found to have inhaled water, indicating that they were conscious and succumbed to an uncontrollable urge to breathe rather than blacking out. Victims are usually established practitioners of deep breath-hold diving, are fit, strong swimmers and have not experienced problems before. Blackout by this mechanism may occur even after surfacing from depth and breathing has commenced if the inhaled oxygen has not yet reached the brain and may be referred to as a surface blackout.

The partial pressure of oxygen in the air in the lungs controls the oxygen loading of blood. A critical pO_{2} of 30 millimetres of mercury (40 mbar) in the lungs will sustain consciousness when breathing is resumed after a breath-hold dive. This is about 4% oxygen in the lungs and 45% oxygen saturation of the arterial blood. At 30 msw (4 bar), 2% by volume oxygen in the lung gas gives a pO_{2} of 60 millimetres of mercury (80 mbar). At 10 msw (2 bar), for the same 2% oxygen, the pO_{2} would be 30 millimetres of mercury (40 mbar), i.e. marginal. At the surface the same 2% oxygen drops to 15 millimetres of mercury (20 mbar), ignoring metabolic use.

Three factors are thought to be involved: voluntary suppression of breathing and rapid depressurisation are necessarily present, and self-induced hypocapnia by hyperventilation is known to be present in many cases. Depressurisation on ascent is one explanation for the shallow depth of ascent blackouts but does not fully explain all cases, unless accompanied by an underlying suppression of the urge to breathe through self-induced hypocapnia via hyperventilation.

1. Voluntary suppression of breathing. Deep water blackout is sometimes attributed simply to the practiced diver's ability through training to suppress the urge to breathe. If surviving divers are aware that they have heavily suppressed the urge to breathe towards the end of the dive, there is a tendency to look no further for an explanation. However, there are two problems with this as an explanation:
  1. Even with a high level of training, the hypercapnic urge to breathe is almost impossible to overcome; swimmers typically suffer an uncontrollable, violent, deep inhalation of water even when, intellectually, they know that to do so is fatal. This is a simple case of running out of air. Victims of ascent blackout, if they have any water in the lungs at all, will have a limited amount in the bronchi consistent with natural ingress after death.
  2. Victims of deep water blackout, closely observed from both below and above water, do not exhibit the signs of distress associated with an uncontrollable urge to breathe, and those that have survived a blackout report no such distress. Many blackout events have been closely observed and even filmed, because deep dynamic apnoea dives are a competitive event and very deep dives require a considerable support crew both above and below water. Anecdotal accounts of healthy divers holding their breath to the point of unconsciousness without hyperventilation are difficult to substantiate and the ability, if it exists, is certainly extremely rare.
2. Rapid depressurisation. Because ascent blackout occurs as the diver approaches the surface from a deep dive, depressurisation is clearly present. Consciousness depends on a minimum partial pressure of oxygen in the brain, not on the absolute quantity of the gas in the system. At the surface, the air in the lungs is under 1 atmosphere of pressure; at 10 metres, the water pressure doubles the pressure of air in the lungs to 2 atmospheres. Recreational breath-hold dives can often go below 20 metres, competitive divers can go much deeper, and the "No limits" free-dive record exceeds 200 metres since 2007. Ten metres is easily achievable by a reasonably fit and competent swimmer. Most people lose consciousness when the partial pressure of oxygen in their lungs, normally 105 millimetres of mercury (140 mbar), falls below about 30 millimetres of mercury (40 mbar). A ppO_{2} of 45 millimetres of mercury (60 mbar) at ten metres will be tolerable to the diver while at that depth, but is likely to result in a blackout between four metres and the surface when the ambient pressure reduction brings the partial pressure of oxygen below the limit. S. Miles termed this latent hypoxia. Although quite comfortable at the bottom, the diver may actually be trapped by latent hypoxia, and unaware that it is now no longer possible to ascend safely, but is likely to black out without warning just as they approach the surface.
3. Self-induced hypocapnia. Hyperventilation leading to hypocapnia and subsequent loss of an appropriate urge to breathe is the mechanism behind shallow water blackout. Many practitioners of deep water breath-hold diving use hyperventilation with the intention of extending their bottom time, so this mechanism is also relevant to deep water blackouts in those cases. If the diver has hyperventilated, the mechanism is essentially that of a shallow water blackout, but with hypoxia delayed by pressure at depth and setting in only when the pressure drops while surfacing. This explains why divers who black out like this do so very close to the surface on their way up and why they may not have felt any urgency to breathe at all; fit, free-divers ascending from deep dives can black out without any warning.

=== Surface blackout ===
Surface blackout occurs just after the diver exhales on the surface, and may happen before, during, or after inhalation of the first breath. When the diver exhales, there is usually a reduction of intrathoracic pressure, which is exacerbated by the effort of inhalation, which can further compromise the partial pressure of oxygen in the alveolar capillaries and, after a small time lag, the oxygen supply to the brain. The exhalation also reduces the buoyancy of the diver and increases the risk of sinking as a consequence of blackout. The drop in intrathoracic pressure may also reduce cardiac output for this period and thereby further compromise the cerebral oxygen supply. The delay between breathing and the oxygenated blood reaching the brain can exceed 15 seconds. Competitive freediving safety monitors watch the diver for at least 30 seconds after surfacing. Recovery breathing may reduce the risk of surface blackout during the critical period after surfacing.

== Consequences ==
The usual consequence of blackout, if the diver's airway is not protected, is drowning. A diver who has blacked out and has been promptly returned to the surface will usually regain consciousness within seconds. While the diver is still unconscious underwater, they are at high risk of drowning. The time between loss of consciousness and death varies considerably depending on a number of factors but can be as little as 2 1/2 minutes.

An unconscious diver loses voluntary bodily control, but still has protective reflexes that protect the airway. One of these is laryngospasm, which closes the larynx to prevent water from entering the lungs. After some time a laryngospasm will relax and the airway will open. If the diver has reached the surface and the diver's face is kept above water, when the laryngospasm relaxes, spontaneous breathing will often resume.

If the diver is still underwater when the laryngospasm relaxes, then water will enter the airway and may reach the lungs, which will cause complications even if resuscitation is successful. Secondary drowning may occur as a result.

== Differential diagnosis ==
The sudden and unexpected death of a swimmer, with no involuntary drowning sequence, can be difficult to ascribe to a specific cause. The possibilities may include pre-existing organic cardiac disease, pre-existing cardiac electrical abnormalities, epilepsy, hypoxic blackout, homicide and suicide. The diagnosis may have significant legal consequences.

Careful recording of observed events can improve the chances of correct diagnosis. The victim of hypoxic blackout may have been seen to be hyperventilating before the dive, and typically the blackout will have occurred some time after immersion, often before surfacing but close to the surface. The victim is subsequently found unconscious or dead at the bottom of the water. Accounts of witnesses may be useful in diagnosing the cause and in the resuscitation and treatment of survivors.

== Risk ==
The risk of freediving blackout is not known, as there are currently no rigorous data on freediving blackouts. However, the estimated, average, annual fatalities attributed to freediver blackout over a period of ten years in a population of approximately 135,000 divers in nine countries was 53 per year, or one in 2,547. The total number of fatalities appears to have remained unchanged in recent years, but it is not possible to calculate the fatality rate because variables such as the number of dives and the diver population are not known. The risk also differs across diving cultures and practices: for example, approximately 70% of Italian divers who regularly compete in national and international spearfishing competitions have had at least one blackout, whereas Japanese Ama divers have a low rate of blackout as they follow a conservative dive profile, limiting dive duration to one minute, resting between dives and making several short dives rather than fewer long ones.

Experienced free-divers are at particular risk because of their practiced ability to suppress the carbon dioxide induced urge to breathe. Some argue that the highest risk may be to intermediate skilled divers who are training hard and have not recognised their limits.

Where deep breath-hold divers are observed to use hyperventilation, timely and informed advice may save their lives, but experience suggests that divers are reluctant to change their practice unless they have a very clear understanding of the mechanics of the process.

== Management ==
=== Avoidance and prevention ===
Breath-hold divers who hyperventilate before a dive increase their risk of drowning. Many drownings unattributed to any other cause are assumed to result from shallow water blackout, and could be avoided if this mechanism was properly understood and the practice controlled or eliminated. Increased advocacy to improve public awareness of the risk is one of the few available ways to attempt to reduce the incidence of this problem.

Shallow water blackout can be avoided by ensuring that carbon dioxide levels in the body are normally balanced prior to diving and that appropriate safety measures are in place. The following precautions are recommended by several organizations:

1. The diver should be weighted to provide positive buoyancy at the surface even after exhalation. Weights should be ditched if in trouble.
2. Before a dive, the diver should relax and allow blood oxygen and carbon dioxide to reach equilibrium. The diver should breathe normally in preparation for a dive, and allow the normal breathing triggers to dictate the rate of breathing to make sure the carbon dioxide levels are within safe limits. The final pre-dive breath should be to full inspiratory capacity.
3. If excited or anxious about the dive, the diver should take extra care to remain calm and breathe naturally, as adrenaline (epinephrine) can cause hyperventilation without the diver noticing.
4. When the urge to breathe comes on near the end of the dive, the diver should surface immediately and breathe. Recovery breathing should not be necessary, but is unlikely to be harmful.
5. Divers should never free dive alone. Diving in buddy pairs, one to observe, one to dive, allows the observer to attempt a rescue in the event of an observed or suspected blackout. The safety diver should always be well ventilated and ready to go to the rescue at immediate notice.
6. Dives should be within the depth capability of both divers. However, this still relies on the buddy noticing a problem in time, and being able to reach the distressed diver, under the stress of an emergency.
7. After surfacing, the condition of the diver should be monitored for at least 30 seconds.
8. Buddy pairs should both know how to recognize and manage a blackout.

A high level of hypocapnia is readily recognized as it causes dizziness and tingling of the fingers. These extreme symptoms are caused by the increase of blood pH (alkalosis) following the reduction of CO_{2}, which is required to maintain the acidity of the blood. The absence of any symptoms of hypocapnia is not an indication that the diver's carbon dioxide level is within safe limits and cannot be taken as an indication that it is therefore safe to dive. Conservative breath-hold divers who hyperventilate but stop doing so before the onset of these symptoms are likely to be hypocapnic already without knowing it.

Outright banning of hyperventilation and breath-hold training at swimming pools may reduce or prevent instances of blackout at those pools, but may result in the activity being done at other places where there may be less supervision and a higher risk of fatality. Supervision by a person not involved in the activity but still familiar with the risks and management of blackouts is a preferred option.

An analysis of incidents suggests that lifeguards at swimming pools could prevent most accidents by watching out for young male swimmers who are practicing hyperventilation and underwater swimming.

=== Recognition ===
Recognition of the problem in time to help is critical; the diver will not notice any symptoms and is dependent on a dive buddy or surface support team for recognition. Indicators of blackout to look for in a diver include:

- Diver stops swimming for no apparent reason.
- Diver begins to sink.
- Arms or legs go limp.
- Eyes roll back or close.
- Head falls forward.
- Body twitches or spasms.

=== Rescue ===
Rescue requires a competent diver on site to recover the unconscious diver to the surface, or prevent them from sinking in the case of a surface blackout. This requires that the safety diver is aware of the status of the diver in time to react effectively. The unconscious freediver should be brought to the surface with minimum delay. There is no risk of lung over-pressure injury, and the airway should be secured if possible to prevent aspiration. The mask is adequate protection of the nasal passages if in place, and a hand can be used to cover the mouth and hold it closed.

Once surfaced, ensure an open airway. The mask may be removed at this point. The diver may spontaneously resume breathing. Typical response time after shallow dives is 3 to 10 seconds, increasing to 10 to 30 seconds for deep dives. If the diver starts breathing and regains consciousness spontaneously, they should be continuously monitored until out of the water.

If the diver does not spontaneously resume breathing, rescue breathing (artificial ventilation) is indicated. The casualty should be removed from the water expeditiously and basic life support provided until expert assistance is available.

=== First aid and medical treatment ===
When first aid and medical treatment are necessary, it is for drowning rather than the blackout itself.

Initial resuscitation follows the standard procedure for drowning. The checks for responsiveness and breathing are carried out with the person horizontally supine. If unconscious but breathing, the recovery position is appropriate. If not breathing, rescue ventilation is necessary. Drowning can produce a gasping pattern of apnea while the heart is still beating, and ventilation alone may be sufficient, as the heart may be basically healthy, but hypoxic. The airway-breathing-circulation sequence should be followed, not starting with compressions, as the basic problem is lack of oxygen. Five initial breaths are recommended, as the initial ventilation may be difficult because of water in the airways, which can interfere with effective alveolar inflation. Thereafter, a sequence of two breaths and 30 chest compressions is recommended, repeated until vital signs are re-established, the rescuers are unable to continue, or advanced life support is available.

Attempts to actively expel water from the airway by abdominal thrusts or positioning head downwards should be avoided, as they delay the start of ventilation and increase the risk of vomiting, leading to a significantly increased risk of death as aspiration of stomach contents is a common complication of resuscitation efforts. Administration of oxygen at 15 litres per minute by face mask or bag mask is often sufficient, but tracheal intubation with mechanical ventilation may be necessary. Suctioning of pulmonary oedema fluid should be balanced against the need for oxygenisation. The goal of ventilation is to achieve 92% to 96% arterial saturation and adequate chest rise. Positive end-expiratory pressure will generally improve oxygenation.

== See also ==
- Freediving – Underwater diving without breathing apparatus, for more on the practice of breath-hold diving as a sport.
- Drowning – Respiratory impairment caused by submersion in liquid, for more on the mechanism and physiology of drowning and deaths from drowning.
- Pulmonary alveolus – Hollow cavity found in the lungs, for a discussion of gas pressure in the lung.
- Apnea – Suspension of breathing, also breath-hold diving.
- Cheyne–Stokes respiration – Abnormal breathing pattern, another condition involving oxygen / carbon dioxide imbalance and which can affect healthy mountaineers.
