= Scott Carney =

American journalist and anthropologist (born 1978)

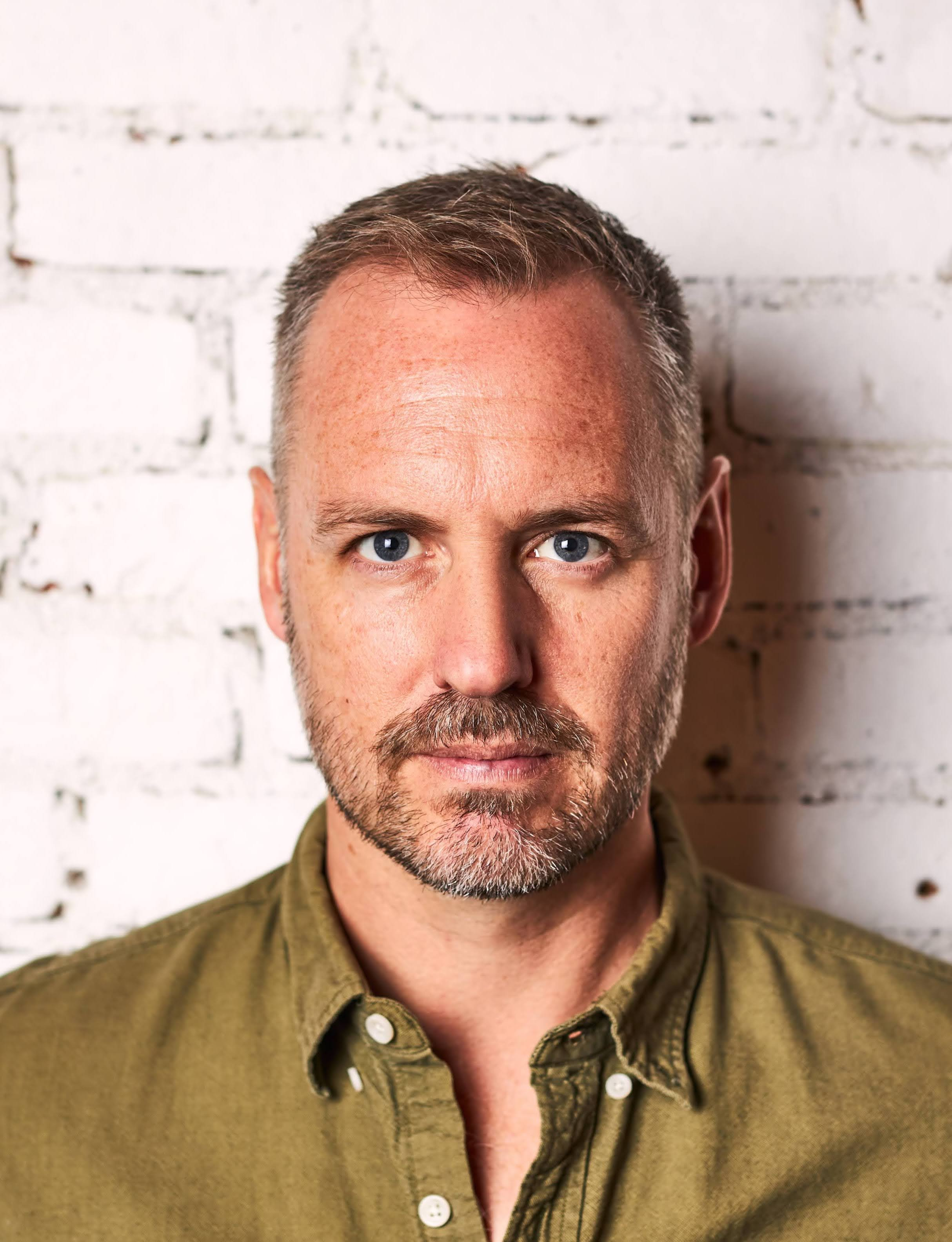
- Born: July 9, 1978 (age 48)
- Occupations: writer and anthropologist
- Writing career
- Genre: investigative journalism
- Notable works: The Red Market; The Enlightenment Trap; What Doesn't Kill Us; The Wedge; The Vortex
- Notable awards: Payne Award for Ethics in Journalism
- Website: scottcarney.com

Scott Carney (born July 9, 1978) is an American investigative journalist, author and anthropologist. He is the author of six books: The Red Market, The Enlightenment Trap, What Doesn't Kill Us, The Wedge, The Vortex and Dream. Carney contributes stories on a variety of medical, technological and ethical issues to Wired, Mother Jones, Playboy, Foreign Policy, Men's Journal, and National Public Radio. He began posting his investigations on YouTube starting in 2022.

Carney holds a number of academic and professional appointments including as a contributing editor at Wired, a senior fellow at the Schuster Institute for Investigative Journalism at Brandeis University, and as a judge for the Payne Award for Ethics in Journalism. He graduated from Kenyon College in 2000 and dropped out of a Ph.D. in anthropology from the University of Wisconsin-Madison in order to pursue journalism.

Carney was the first American journalist to write about "Iceman" Wim Hof in a 2014 article in Playboy. The book that came out of that research, What Doesn't Kill Us, spent two months on the New York Times bestseller list in 2017. His 2020 book, The Wedge, explores the core concepts of the Wim Hof Method and applies them to a wide array of physical training.

He reported from Chennai, India, between 2006 and 2009. In 2015 he founded the Denver-based media company Foxtopus Ink, which produces audio books, video courses and podcasts. In 2018 Foxtopus Ink released the first season of the podcast Wild Thing on the search for bigfoot.

== Works ==
=== The Red Market ===
Carney coined the phrase "the red market" to describe a broad category of economic transactions around the human body. Drawing on the concepts black markets, white markets and gray markets he suggests that commerce in body parts is separate because bodies are not commodities in a strict sense. Instead, commerce in human bodies needs to account for the ineffable quality of life and creates a lifelong debt between the provider and receiver of the flesh. Straight commerce in human bodies disguises the supply chain and reduces a human life to its meat value. Carney calls for "radical transparency" in the red market supply chain in order to protect its humanness.

The book, The Red Market traces the rise, fall, and resurgence of this multibillion-dollar underground organ trade through history, from early medical study and modern universities to poverty-ravaged Eurasian villages and high-tech Western labs; from body snatchers and surrogate mothers to skeleton dealers and the poor who sell body parts to survive. While local and international law enforcement have cracked down on the market, advances in science have increased the demand for human tissue—ligaments, kidneys, even rented space in women's wombs—leaving little room to consider the ethical dilemmas inherent in the flesh-and-blood trade.

=== The Enlightenment Trap ===
The Enlightenment Trap examines the unusual circumstances around the death of Ian Thorson while on a meditation retreat in the mountains of Arizona. The book uses Thorson's story as a springboard to understanding the path that Tibetan Buddhism took to get to the United States and analyzes the often conflicted relationship that Americans have with the concept of enlightenment. Carney recounts the story of the death of his former student Emily O'Conner who took her life on a meditation retreat in India in 2006. Thorson was a follower of the controversial Buddhist guru Michael Roach who teaches a version of Buddhism that closely aligns with the Christian Gospel of Prosperity. Carney's book is based in part on his article in Playboy, "Death and Madness on Diamond Mountain". The book was originally published under the title A Death on Diamond Mountain and was re-released in 2016 under a new title.

=== What Doesn't Kill Us ===
In 2011 Carney travelled to meet Dutch fitness guru Wim Hof in Poland on an assignment from Playboy with the intention of exposing him as a charlatan. Hof claimed to be able to teach a meditation technique that would allow people to consciously control their body temperature and immune systems. The claims were similar to those made by Michael Roach. After a week studying the method, however, Carney "had to reevaluate everything he thought about gurus". Within a week he learned how to perform similar feats as Hof, including hiking up a snow covered mountain wearing just a bathing suit. His book, What Doesn't Kill Us, continues the journey by linking evolutionary theory and environmental conditioning with the Wim Hof Method. He interviews US Army scientists who are trying to find ways to make soldiers more effective in extreme environments, the founders of the outdoor workout movement the November Project, legendary surfer Laird Hamilton and endurance runner Brian MacKenzie. Carney ends his journey by climbing up to the top of Mount Kilimanjaro, most of the way, wearing just a bathing suit.

Carney has since revised his position on Wim Hof after discovering 19 deaths-by-drowning related to people practicing the Wim Hof Method in water and passing out from shallow-water blackout. Carney attributes the deaths to people following Wim Hof's instructions on various official training courses and YouTube videos that depict Hof hyperventilating in water in apparent contradiction to Hof's own official warnings. The Dutch newspaper de Volkskrant independently verified his claims.

=== The Wedge ===
"The most comfortable way to think about the Wedge is that it's a choice to separate stimulus from response", by which Carney means using the conscious action of the mind to interrupt the automatic physical reactions of the body. Carney suggests that all living things use the wedge to navigate the hard problem of consciousness through sensation. Every sensation offers an opportunity for choice, and thus choice is the fundamental unit of consciousness. Carney draws on the work of neuroscientist Andrew Huberman at Stanford to explain how fear and anxiety offer opportunities to use the Wedge and proceeds to put his own body under various sorts of environmental stresses—saunas, throwing kettlebells, MDMA therapy, flotation tanks, breathwork and ayahuasca—to test the concept for himself. The book received favorable coverage on Here and Now, Men's Journal, Kirkus and Outside.

=== The Vortex ===
In 1970 the Great Bhola Cyclone killed 500,000 people in East Pakistan and set off a series of cataclysmic events that almost culminated in nuclear war between the United States and USSR. Scott Carney and Jason Miklian tell the story of The Vortex through the eyes of cyclone survivors, two genocidal presidents (Richard Nixon and Yahya Khan), a soccer star turned soldier and mutineer Hafiz Uddin Ahmad, and American aid worker and a weatherman from Miami who tried to avert disaster. The Vortex received largely favorable reviews in The Washington Post and NPR for linking the effects of climate change to armed conflict. The Vortex was included on the long-list of finalists for the 2023 Carnegie Medal for excellence in nonfiction.

== YouTube ==
Starting in 2022 Carney began posting long form investigative videos on YouTube, starting with an expose on what he identified as unethical business practices of Wim Hof's organization. From there he began to do similar exposes on popular figures in the wellness world including on Andrew Huberman, David Sinclair and Mel Robbins. He coined the term "The Griftoverse" to describe media ecosystem that connects the dominant social media business model with the monetization of lying. The show passed 250,000 subscribers in June 2026.

== Awards ==
Carney won the 2010 Payne Award for Ethics in Journalism for his story "Meet the Parents". In 2008, he was selected as a finalist for the Livingston Award for International Journalism for an article titled "The Bone Factory". He was also a finalist for the same award in 2010 for this story "Cash on Delivery" about surrogate pregnancies in India. He has been nominated for the Daniel Pearl Award from the South Asian Journalists Association three times. The Red Market won the 2012 Clarion Award for best non-fiction book. The Vortex was included on the long-list of finalists for the 2023 Carnegie Medal for excellence in nonfiction.
