= John E. Katsos =

John E. Katsos is a Greek-American Professor of Management, Entrepreneurship, and Strategy at the American University of Sharjah in the United Arab Emirates. He also held positions as a Visiting Lecturer at University College Cork in Ireland and as Visiting Professor at Kelley School of Business. He was editor-in-chief of Society and Business Review (Emerald). until 2026. He conducts research on how businesses can act sustainably and promote social value through crisis and conflict. Katsos, along with Timothy L. Fort, Jason Miklian, and Per Saxegaard were nominated for the 2024 Nobel Peace Prize for their work promoting business engagement in peace.

== Research ==
Katsos's research focuses on the intersection of business ethics, corporate social responsibility, and conflict management. His work explores ways in which businesses can operate ethically and sustainably amidst political and social turmoil.

His most well-known work, with John J. Forrer, provides evidence that companies can have the greatest impact on peace in the 6–10 years after the cessation of hostilities, which they term the “buffer condition”.

Katsos has been cited in UN General Assembly reports and the Financial Times, Washington Post, Harvard Business Review, and Journal of Business Ethics. His work is based on direct engagement with businesses in Syria, Iraq, Sri Lanka, Colombia, Palestine, Cyprus, Lebanon, Ukraine, and China. Katsos's recent book, Ethical Leadership in Conflict and Crisis, is the most read leadership book in the Cambridge University Press Elements series.

== Awards and recognition ==
Katsos has been the recipient of numerous awards including Best Paper Awards for his work on business support of refugees and peace-supporting entrepreneurs and the Haverford College Lawrence Forman Award for athletes devoted a significant amount of time and energy to the betterment of society. Katsos is also the Chair of the United Nations PRME Network's Business and Peace Working Group.
