= Unconsciousness =

Loss of awareness of self and environment

- Specialty: Psychiatry; Neurology; Cardiology; Pulmonology; Emergency medicine

Unconsciousness is a state in which a living individual exhibits a complete, or near-complete, inability to maintain an awareness of self and environment or to respond to any human or environmental stimulus. Unconsciousness may occur as the result of traumatic brain injury, brain hypoxia (inadequate oxygen, possibly due to a brain infarction or cardiac arrest), severe intoxication with drugs that depress the activity of the central nervous system (e.g., alcohol and other hypnotic or sedative drugs), severe fatigue, pain, anaesthesia, and other causes.

Loss of consciousness should not be confused with the notion of the psychoanalytic unconscious, cognitive processes that take place outside awareness (e.g., implicit cognition), and with altered states of consciousness such as sleep, delirium, hypnosis, and other altered states in which the person responds to stimuli, including trance and psychedelic experiences.

== Causes ==
This is not a complete list.

=== Cardiovascular system ===
- Arrhythmia (irregular heart beat)
- Bleeding
- Cardiac arrest
- Cardiomegaly
- Heart failure (HF) (congestive heart failure (CHF))
- Myocardial infarction (MI) (heart attack)
- Myocarditis
- Pericarditis
- Shock

=== Nervous system ===
- Brain abscess
- Brain tumor
- Encephalitis
- Increased intracranial pressure
- Intracerebral hemorrhage (hemorrhagic stroke)
- Ischemic stroke
- Meningitis
- Seizure
- Subarachnoid hemorrhage
- Traumatic brain injury (TBI) (intracranial injury)

=== Respiratory system ===
- Acute respiratory distress syndrome (ARDS)
- Choking
- Drowning
- Lung cancer (lung carcinoma)
- Pneumonia
- Pulmonary embolism (PE)
- Respiratory arrest
- Respiratory failure

=== Other ===
- Drugs
- Electrocution
- Kidney failure
- Liver failure
- Poison or venom
- Sepsis

== Law and medicine ==
Person passed out on a sidewalk in New York City, 2008

In jurisprudence, unconsciousness may entitle the criminal defendant to the defense of automatism, i.e. a state without control of one's own actions, an excusing condition that allows a defendant to argue that they should not be held criminally liable for their actions or omissions. In most countries, courts must consider whether unconsciousness in a situation can be accepted as a defense; it can vary from case to case. Hence epileptic seizures, neurological dysfunctions, and sleepwalking may be considered acceptable excusing conditions because the loss of control is not foreseeable, but falling asleep (especially while driving or during any other safety-critical activity) may not, because natural sleep rarely overcomes an ordinary person without warning.

In many countries, it is presumed that someone who is less than fully conscious cannot give consent to anything. This can be relevant in cases of sexual assault, euthanasia, or patients giving informed consent with regard to starting or stopping a medical treatment.

== See also ==
- Coma
- Do not resuscitate
- Greyout
- Hypnosis
- Living will
- Shallow water blackout
- Sleep
- Somnophilia
- Syncope (fainting)
- Trance
- Traumatic brain injury
- Twilight sleep
