= Wim Hof =

Dutch extreme athlete (born 1959)

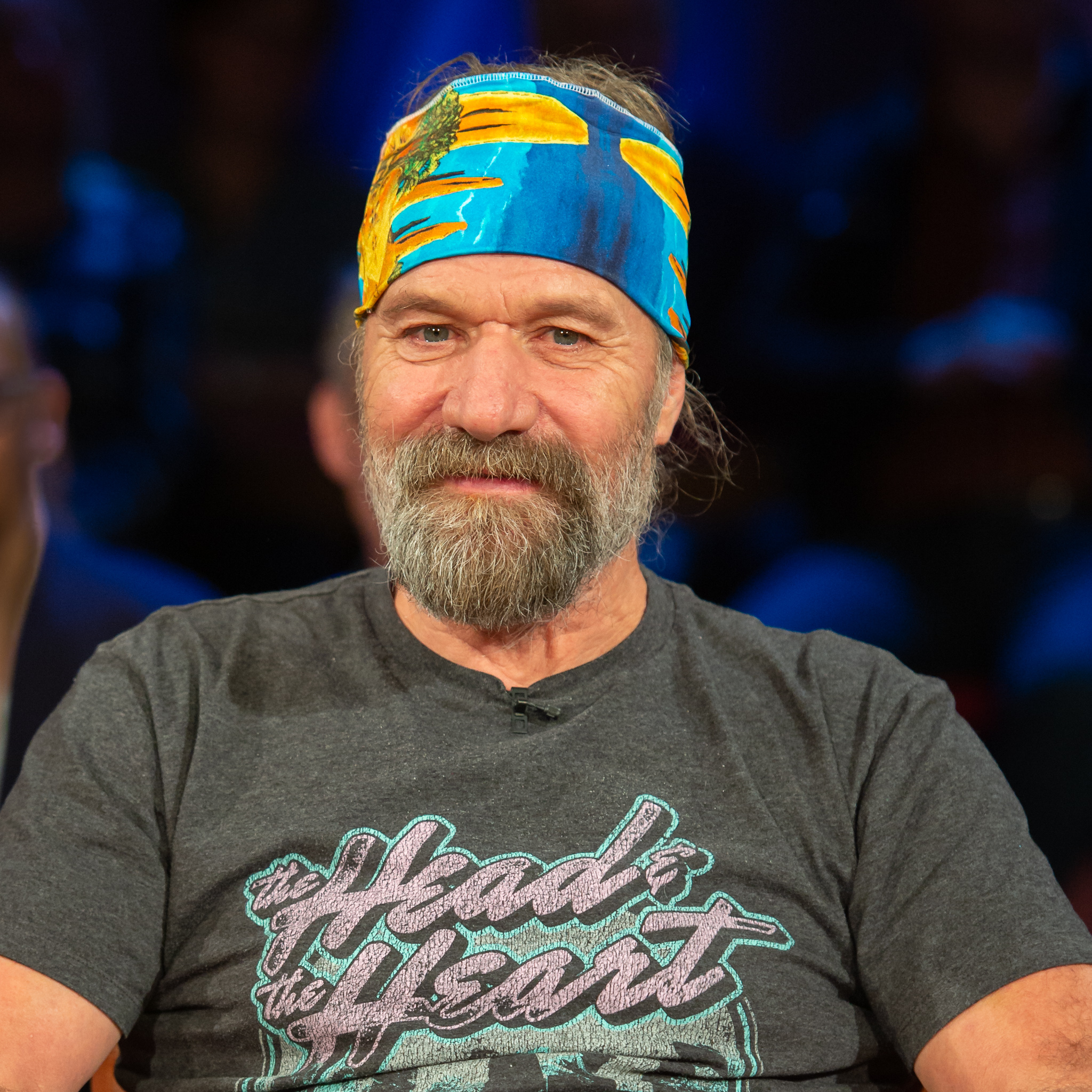
- Hof in 2019
- Born: 20 April 1959 (age 67); Sittard, Netherlands
- Other name: The Iceman
- Occupations: Extreme athlete and motivational speaker, former karateka

Wim Hof (pronounced [ʋɪm ˈɦɔf]; born 20 April 1959), also known as The Iceman, is a Dutch motivational speaker and extreme athlete known for his ability to withstand low temperatures.

He previously held a Guinness World Record for swimming under ice and prolonged full-body contact with ice, and he holds a record for a barefoot half marathon on ice and snow. He attributes these feats to his Wim Hof Method (WHM), a combination of frequent cold exposure, breathing techniques and meditation. Hof's method has been the subject of several scientific studies, with mixed results.

== Early life ==
Wim Hof was born on 20 April 1959 in Sittard, Limburg, Netherlands. He was one of nine children.

== Wim Hof Method ==
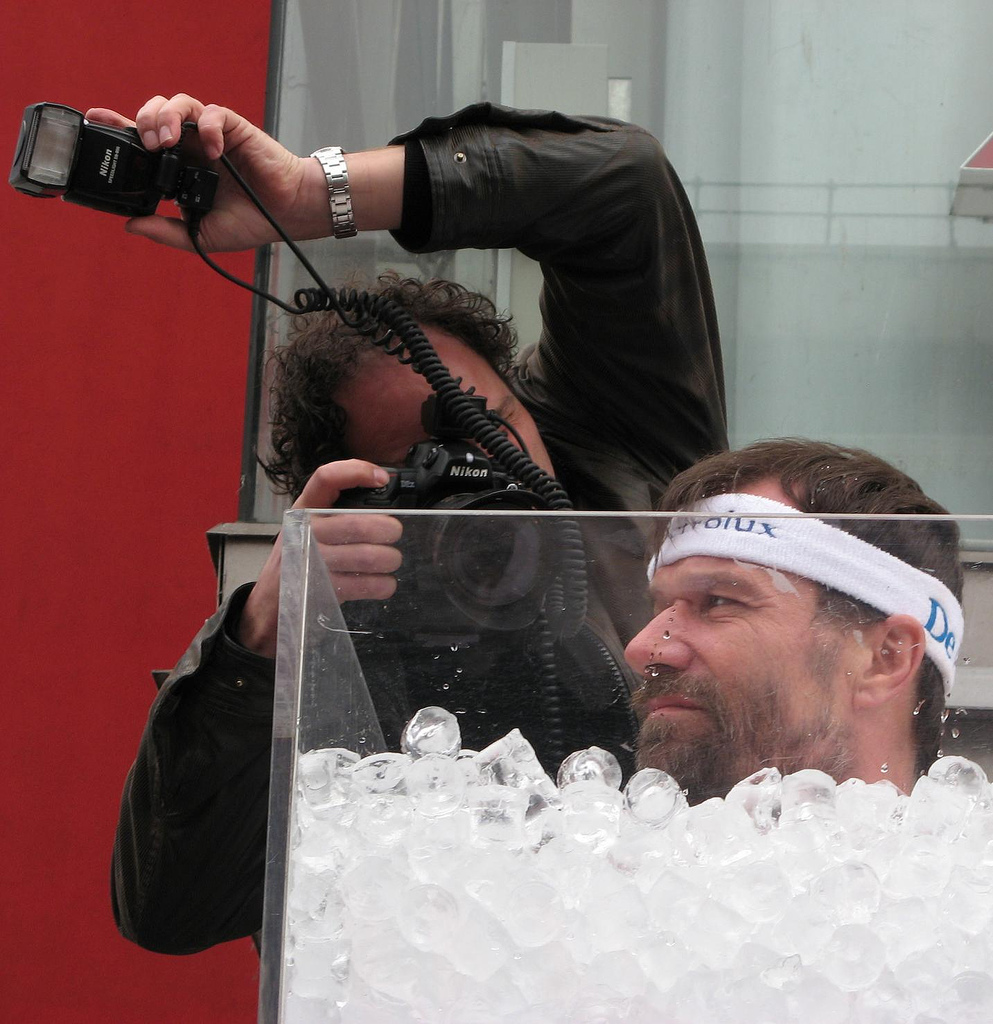
Hof immersed in an ice bath on 24 March 2007, Rotterdam

Hof is an extreme athlete noted for his ability to withstand low temperatures. He attributes his feats to his Wim Hof Method (WHM).

Hof's first relevant experiences with the cold date back to when he was 17: he felt a sudden urge to jump into the freezing cold water of the Beatrixpark canal. The first relevant scientific investigation began in 2011 at Radboud University. On 19 April 2011, the results of this study were broadcast on Dutch national television.

Hof markets a regimen called the Wim Hof Method (WHM), which involves willpower, exposure to cold water, and breathing techniques. A 2024 meta-analysis of eight studies found that the method may reduce inflammation, through the increase of epinephrine. However, effects on exercise performance and respiratory parameters were mixed. And most of the articles were judged as "high concern due to the difficulty in blinding the participants and researchers to the intervention." The authors cautioned that "the quality of the studies is very low, meaning that all the results must be interpreted with caution. Additionally, the low sample size (15–48 individuals per study) and large proportion of males in the studies (86.4%) make the results non-generalizable to the public," and suggested that further research is needed.

=== Criticism and safety ===
Hof has been criticized for his public statements, claiming that individuals with rheumatoid arthritis, multiple sclerosis, and even cancer could benefit from his method. His lead researchers, Pickkers and Kox, had previously warned him against making such health claims, stating they were scientifically unjustified. Additionally, Hof told the media that research proved his body could neutralize bacteria more quickly, though this was not a conclusion of the actual study.

=== Method-related deaths ===
Concerning cold exposure, The American Heart Association and the British Heart Foundation have issued warnings about cold therapy, advising consulting with a physician before attempting, and noting that there is poor evidence supporting the practice. As of March 2024 there are 32 reports of people dying allegedly due to the Wim Hof Method. According to one expert, immersion in cold water can produce cardiac arrhythmia in 1 to 3 percent of young healthy subjects, but up to 63 percent will suffer arrhythmia when asked to hold their breath before the plunge. "It's an incredible way of reproducing cardiac arrhythmias in otherwise fit and healthy individuals," he said. Some experts say that practicing the Wim Hof Method is "gambling with your life".

Four practitioners drowned in 2015 and 2016, and relatives suspected the breathing exercises were to blame. In 2021, a Singaporean man drowned in a condominium pool when attempting the method. One person died after a cold water therapy session in the UK in 2022. A $67 million lawsuit was filed against Innerfire and Wim Hof in 2022 that alleged 17-year-old Madelyn Rose Metzger died after performing the Wim Hof Method in her pool in Long Beach, California. Wim Hof was found not liable in 2024 because it could not "be proven that the girl was doing the exercises in the pool at the time and if that caused her to drown."

=== Risk of drowning ===
The breathing exercises can induce a form of hyperventilation that may lead to a brief loss of consciousness. If this occurs underwater, it can result in a shallow water blackout, which can be fatal—a phenomenon well-known among divers and swimmers.

In articles published by Het Parool in 2016, the deaths of four practitioners of the Wim Hof Method were reported. Autopsy reports confirmed drowning as the cause of death in several of these cases. Relatives of the deceased suspected a direct link between performing the breathing exercises in water and the drownings. Wim Hof and the official Wim Hof Method website advise practicing the exercises only in a safe manner and location.

In December 2022, attorney Raphael Metzger filed a civil lawsuit against Wim Hof and his company, Innerfire, following the drowning of his 17-year-old daughter in California. Metzger sought $67 million in damages and an injunction to stop the promotion of the method in the United States. On 2 July 2024, the court dismissed the claim.

In 2023, investigative journalist Scott Carney released a documentary linking the deaths of thirteen people to the practice of the Wim Hof Method.

== Records ==
The fastest half-marathon run while barefoot on ice or snow was 2 hr 16 min 34 sec by Hof near Oulu, Finland, on 26 January 2007. Done for the Discovery Channel program Real Super-humans and the Quest for the Future Fantastic, this Guinness record has been broken since by Pawel Durakiewicz and is currently 1 hour, 50 minutes and 29 seconds as of 2025.

On 16 March 2000, Hof set the Guinness World Record for farthest swim under ice on his second attempt, with a distance of 57.5 metres (188.6 feet). Hof's first attempt the day before failed when he began his swim without goggles and his corneas froze solid and blinded him. A rescue diver pulled him to the surface after he passed out. The record has been broken several times since and now stands at 80.99 metres (265.7 ft) as of 2025.

Hof has set the world record for longest time in direct, full-body contact with ice, 44 minutes in January 2010. Hof's record has been broken several times and as of 2025 it stands at 5 hours, 1 minute and 33 seconds.

=== Other ===
In 2007, Hof climbed to an altitude of 7,400 metres (24,300 ft) on Mount Everest wearing nothing but shorts and shoes, but aborted the attempt due to a recurring foot injury. He managed to climb from base camp to about 6,700 metres (22,000 ft) wearing just shorts and sandals, but after that he wore boots, saying he needed to affix crampons at that point.

In 2016, Hof reached Gilman's Point on Mount Kilimanjaro with journalist Scott Carney in 28 hours, an event later documented in the book What Doesn't Kill Us.

In the early 2000s, Hof sustained a severe injury while swimming in a fountain in Amsterdam. He attempted to use the fountain's jet for an enema, a practice he had performed previously. However, the city had recently increased the jet's pressure, causing the water to perforate his colon and intestines. His son Michael, who was meeting him at the park, took him to the hospital. Due to Hof's high pain tolerance, the severity of the injury was not immediately recognized, and he was not triaged for surgery right away. After several hours, he fainted, prompting emergency surgery. Although the risk of sepsis was significant, Hof reportedly recovered without the use of antibiotics.

== Documentaries ==
A number of documentary films have been produced on Hof's life and ability. In 2015, Vice magazine produced a documentary The Super Human World of Wim Hof: The Iceman. In 2020, the YouTube channel Yes Theory published a short film about their experiences with Hof, titled Becoming Superhuman with Ice Man.

== Personal life ==
Hof met his first wife Marivelle-Maria, also called "Olaya Rosino Fernandez," in the Vondelpark in Amsterdam in the garden of roses. She died by suicide in 1995 by jumping from an eight-story building. Hof stated that she was diagnosed with schizophrenia. He had a hard time psychologically with that incident and the freezing water was the only place he didn't think about it.

In 2024 the Dutch paper de Volkskrant published an extensive article which mentioned his domestic abuse, for which he was convicted in the Netherlands in 2012. In 2012 Hof was found guilty of domestic violence against the eighteen-year old son of his then-girlfriend Caroline. He was sentenced to 40 hours of community service and fined €350, equivalent to €440 in 2023.

== Publications ==
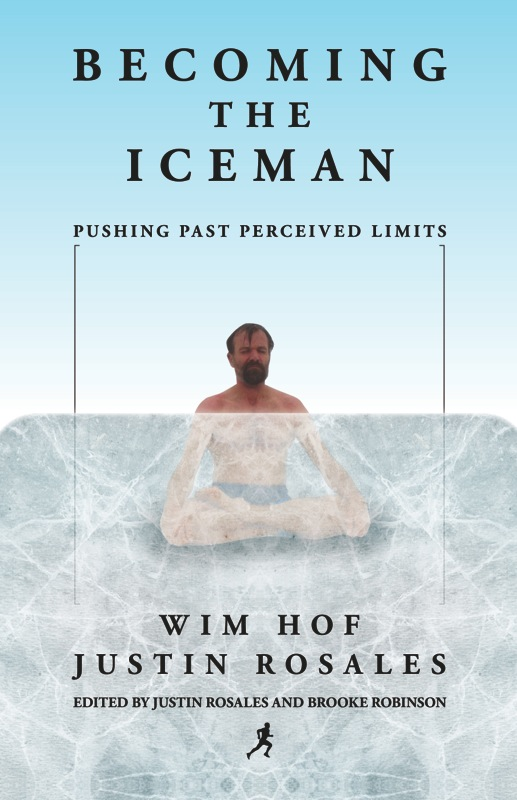
Cover of Becoming the Iceman

- Hof, Wim (1998). Klimmen in stilte [Climbing in silence] (in Dutch). Altamira. ISBN 9789069634395.
- Hof, Wim (2000). De top bereiken is je angst overwinnen [Reaching the top is overcoming your fear] (in Dutch). Andromeda. ISBN 9789055991136.
- Hof, Wim; Rosales, Justin (2012). Becoming the Iceman : pushing past perceived limits. Mill City Press. ISBN 9781937600464.
- Hof, Wim; Jong, Koen A.M. de (2015). Koud kunstje : wat kun je leren van de iceman?. Uitgeverij Water. ISBN 9789491729256.
- Hof, Wim (2017). Introduction. What Doesn't Kill Us: How Freezing Water, Extreme Altitude and Environmental Conditioning Will Renew Our Lost Evolutionary Strength. By Carney, Scott. Harmony/Rodale/Convergent. ISBN 9781635652413.
- Hof, Wim (2020). The Wim Hof Method. Penguin Random House. ISBN 9781846046292.

== See also ==
- Breathwork
- Diaphragmatic breathing
- Hormesis
- Ice bath
- Kundalini
- Meditation
- Tummo
- Yoga
