= Jason Miklian =

American and Norwegian development studies scholar

Jason T. Miklian (born May 16, 1977) is an American and Norwegian development studies scholar and author. He is a senior researcher of business and development at the Centre for Development and the Environment at the University of Oslo. Miklian is known for his scholarship and commentary on the role of the private sector in conflict and fragile state settings and on South Asia politics. Miklian, along with Timothy L. Fort, John E. Katsos, and Per Saxegaard were nominated for the 2024 Nobel Peace Prize for their work promoting business engagement in peace.

== Education ==
Miklian graduated from the University of Wisconsin-Madison with a B.A. honors degree in South Asian Studies and International Affairs in 2004. He received his M.A. in International Relations in 2006 from the London School of Economics and Ph.D. degree in Development Studies in 2014 from NMBU (Norway).

== Research and commentary ==
Miklian is an influential scholar on issues of peace and conflict in South Asia and on Business for Peace research with a critical development studies perspective, with 40 publications on these topics. Miklian is a member of the United Nations Working Group on Business and Human Rights. Miklian has presented research at institutes and think tanks including the Brookings Institution, Seoul Digital Forum International Crisis Group, Peace Research Institute Oslo, from the United States Department of State and Norwegian Ministry of Foreign Affairs. Miklian has published op-eds and essays in many media outlets, including Foreign Policy, Harvard Business Review, Washington Post, Economic and Political Weekly, and The New York Times.

== The Vortex ==
In 1970 the Great Bhola Cyclone killed 500,000 people in East Pakistan and set off a series of cataclysmic events that almost culminated in a nuclear war between the United States and USSR. Scott Carney and Miklian tell the story of The Vortex through the eyes of cyclone survivors, two genocidal presidents (Richard Nixon and Yahya Khan), a soccer star turned soldier and mutineer Hafiz Uddin Ahmad, and American aid worker and a weatherman from Miami who tried to avert disaster. The Vortex received largely favorable reviews in The Washington Post and NPR for linking the effects of climate change to armed conflict.The Vortex was included on the long-list of finalists for the 2023 Carnegie Medal for excellence in nonfiction.

== Selected publications ==
=== Books ===
- Miklian, Jason and Scott Carney (2022). The Vortex: A True Story of History's Deadliest Storm, an Unspeakable War, and Liberation. New York: Ecco/HarperCollins. ISBN 9780062985415
- Miklian, Jason, Rina Alluri, John Katsos. (Eds.) (2019). Business, Peacebuilding and Sustainable Development (Business and Peacebuilding). New York and London: Routledge. ISBN 9780367175030
- Miklian, Jason and Åshild Kolås (Eds.) (2013). India's Human Security: Lost Debates, Forgotten People, Intractable Challenges. New York: Routledge. ISBN 9780415830683
