= Underwater Hypoxic Blackout Prevention =

American drowning awareness organization

- Abbreviation: UHBP
- Founded: 2011
- Founder: Rhonda Dawes Milner
- Type: 501(c)(3) nonprofit
- Purpose: drowning prevention, water safety, underwater hypoxic blackout awareness
- Location: Norcross, Georgia, U.S.
- Key people: Britt Jackson (Executive Director); Dean E. Haller (Former Executive Director)
- Website: underwaterhypoxicblackout.org

Underwater Hypoxic Blackout Prevention (UHBP), formerly known as Shallow Water Blackout Prevention (SWBP), is an American nonprofit organization headquartered in Norcross, Georgia. Its mission is to prevent drowning deaths caused by underwater hypoxic blackout — a sudden, silent loss of consciousness underwater caused by oxygen deprivation resulting from prolonged breath-holding — through public education, awareness campaigns, professional training, and institutional partnerships.

== Background ==
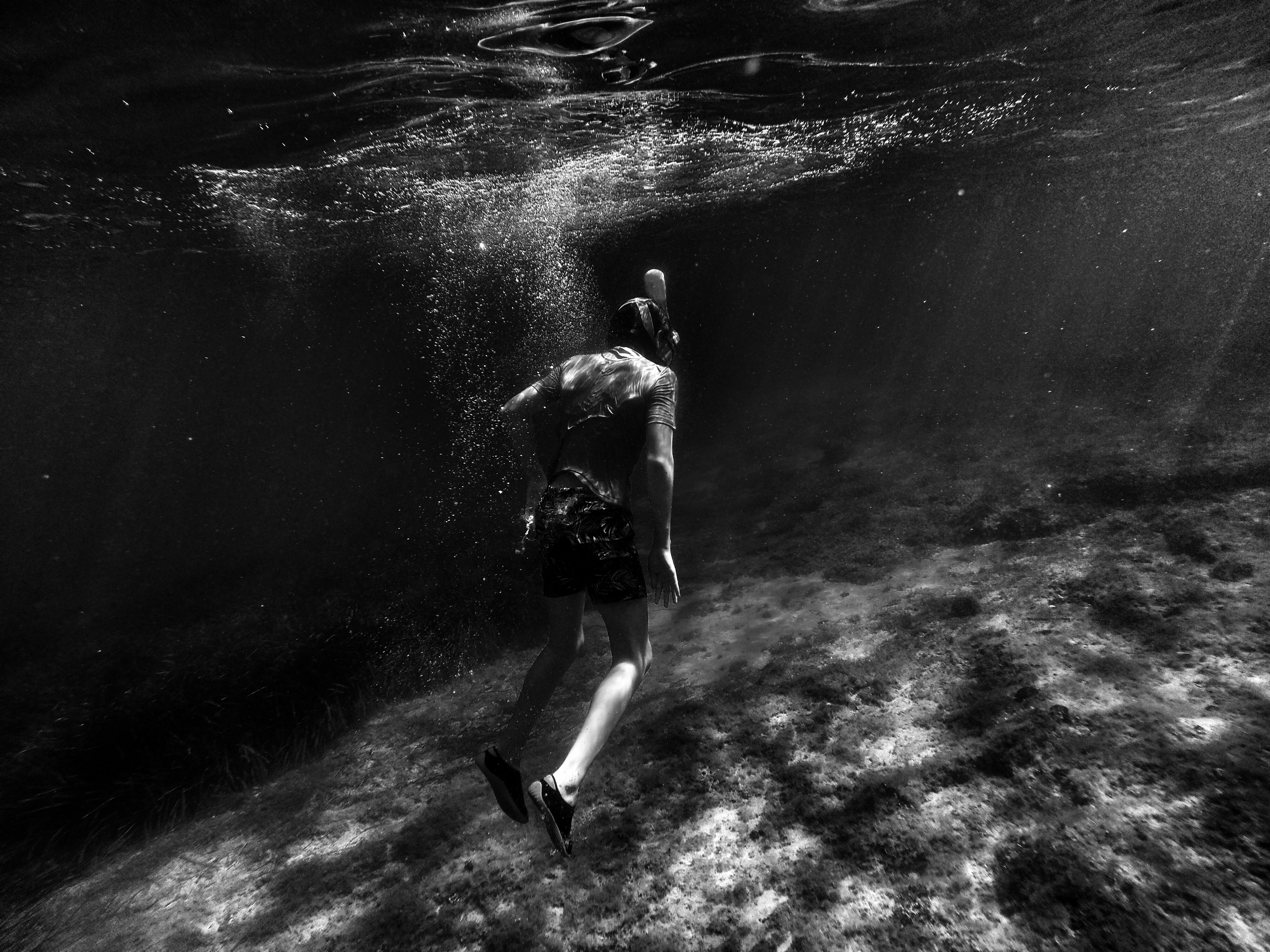
Freedivers and open-water swimmers are among the highest-risk groups for underwater hypoxic blackout, which can occur without any visible warning signs.

Underwater hypoxic blackout, long referred to as "shallow water blackout," occurs when a swimmer holds their breath for longer than the body's natural processes can deal with. Because the body's urge to breathe is triggered by rising carbon dioxide levels (not falling oxygen levels) hyperventilation before a dive artificially suppresses carbon dioxide, tricking the body into believing it has more air than it does. Oxygen then falls to a critical level, causing sudden, silent loss of consciousness before the swimmer feels the urge to surface. The swimmer may drown without any outward struggle or warning, and because there is no visible distress, the event can go undetected even in supervised settings.

The phenomenon is especially dangerous for experienced athletes — competitive swimmers, freedivers, Navy SEALs, snorkelers, and spearfishermen — who are most likely to engage in extended breath-holding training. Brain damage and death can occur in approximately two and a half minutes (faster than in a conventional drowning) due to the body's already oxygen-depleted state and the warmth of pool water.

== History ==
=== Founding ===
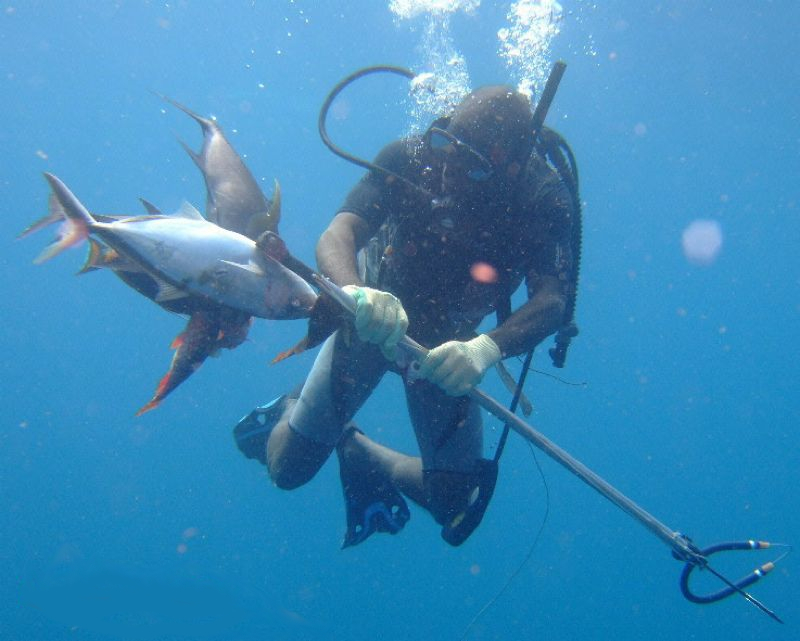
A spearfisher underwater. Whitner Milner was training for a spearfishing trip when he died from underwater hypoxic blackout in 2011, prompting his mother to found the organization.

The organization was founded by Rhonda Dawes Milner, a retired radiologist from Atlanta, Georgia, following the death of her son, Gene "Whitner" Milner. Whitner was 25 years old and in excellent physical condition when he died in his family's swimming pool. He had been practicing breath-holding exercises in preparation for a spearfishing trip and had trained himself to hold his breath for over three minutes. His death was attributed to underwater hypoxic blackout. His obituary appeared in The Atlanta Journal-Constitution on April 20, 2011.

Milner founded Shallow Water Blackout Prevention after that loss with the stated goal of ensuring that no other family would experience a preventable death from a danger that remains broadly unknown to the public.

Whitner Milner and Virgil Price III — a diver who died from suspected underwater hypoxic blackout in 2024 — were childhood friends, a connection that would later draw their two families together in joint advocacy work.

=== Rebrand in 2023 ===
In April 2023, the organization announced a rebrand from Shallow Water Blackout Prevention to Underwater Hypoxic Blackout Prevention, effective immediately. The change aligned the organization's name with terminology adopted by leading aquatic safety bodies — including the American Red Cross, USA Swimming, and the YMCA — which use the term "hypoxic blackout" as more scientifically precise. The term "shallow water" had long been criticized as misleading, since the physiological mechanism (oxygen deprivation to the brain) can occur at any water depth.

Milner stated: "The new name, Underwater Hypoxic Blackout Prevention, truly captures the essence of our organization's mission."

== Legal status and organization structure ==
Shallow Water Blackout Prevention is registered as a 501(c)(3) tax-exempt nonprofit organization under U.S. federal law, with EIN 45-2800251. Its 990 filings are publicly available through the IRS and GuideStar. The organization is headquartered at 5125 Peachtree Industrial Boulevard, Norcross, Georgia 30092.

The organization has been led by multiple executive directors. Britt Jackson is currently and has been serving as Executive Director during a significant period of national expansion, including the partnership with the Michael Phelps Foundation. Dean E. Haller has also served as Executive Director, representing SWBP at national water safety conferences and delivering an international workshop to the Swim Teachers Association of the United Kingdom.

== Operations ==
=== Education and outreach ===
UHBP's stated primary activities are awareness, education, and prevention. Educational audiences include casual swimmers, competitive athletes, freedivers, spearfishermen, swim coaches, lifeguards, and parents. The organization attends national aquatics industry conferences as speakers and exhibitors, delivers presentations to civic organizations including Rotary, Kiwanis, and Lions Clubs, conducts school outreach for students in grades 6–12, engages Parent Teacher Organizations, and works with YMCAs to train staff and lifeguards — all at no charge.

In March 2017, SWBP delivered a breakout session at the first annual South Florida Water Safety Symposium in Sunrise, Florida, attended by over 350 aquatic professionals, healthcare workers, and first responders from Broward, Miami-Dade and Palm Beach counties.

In 2025, UHBP launched the "Take a Breath, Seth!" initiative, a child-focused educational program designed to raise awareness of the dangers of underwater breath-holding among children, classroom teachers, and pediatric medical professionals. The program operates through a dedicated website at takeabreathseth.com and represents the organization's first program specifically targeting pediatric audiences and the healthcare providers who serve them.

=== Ambassador program ===
UHBP operates an ambassador program enabling high school students to earn community service credit by raising awareness within their communities. The organization provides educational materials and warning signage to ambassadors free of charge.

=== Chapter program ===
UHBP works with individuals personally impacted by underwater hypoxic blackout to establish affiliated chapters, providing guidance and materials at no cost. Chapters have been established in several U.S. states as well as in the United Kingdom, Australia, and the Netherlands.

=== Warning signage ===
UHBP promotes and sells poolside "No Long Breath Holding" warning signs, with a portion of proceeds supporting the organization's programs. Aquatic safety experts have endorsed point-of-use signage as a critical behavioral intervention.

=== Family support ===
When the organization becomes aware of a death attributed to underwater hypoxic blackout, it proactively reaches out to the affected family to offer personal support, remaining in contact as long as needed.

=== Data tracking ===
UHBP maintains a public Data Center aggregating incident reports, peer-reviewed research, and media coverage related to underwater hypoxic blackout. The organization describes itself as the only entity systematically tracking and capturing the data needed to advocate for awareness, education, and prevention of the condition.

=== Prevention certification program ===
In 2026, UHBP co-presented at the International Water Safety Conference alongside aquatic safety expert Tom Griffiths, where the organization launched the first Underwater Hypoxic Blackout Prevention Certification Program, marking a formal step toward credentialed professional training in UHB prevention.

== Partnerships ==
=== Michael Phelps Foundation ===
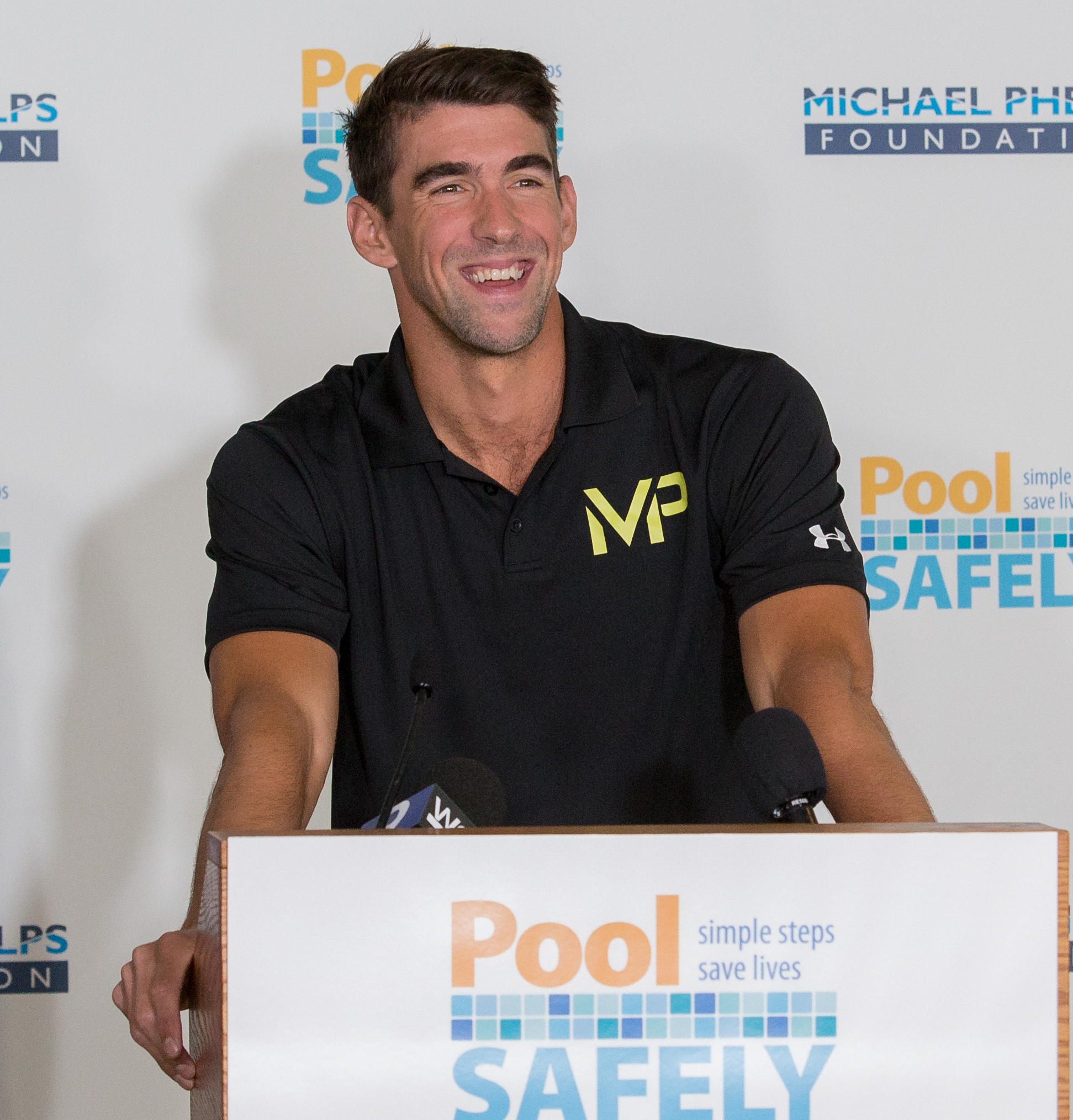
Michael Phelps at a water safety event with the Michael Phelps Foundation, which partnered with UHBP in 2022 to produce the Don't Hold Your Breath public service announcement series.

In August 2022, SWBP announced a partnership with the Michael Phelps Foundation (MPF) to co-produce a series of Don't Hold Your Breath public service announcements (PSAs). The PSAs featured Olympic champion Michael Phelps, Hall of Fame swim coach and MPF Board Member Bob Bowman (coach), and shallow water blackout survivor Chandler Watson. They premiered live on YouTube on August 30, 2022, with a follow-up Q&A session featuring Bowman and Executive Director Britt Jackson.

Phelps stated: "Shallow water blackout is lethal but also preventable, so please educate yourself and your loved ones about the importance of water safety." Bowman noted that the condition carries an approximately 94% fatality rate once a swimmer loses consciousness, as the window for rescue is extremely narrow.

A companion short documentary, Don't Hold Your Breath, was also produced, following survivor Chandler Watson and his family as they navigated the aftermath of his near-fatal blackout.

=== Princess Charlene of Monaco Foundation USA ===
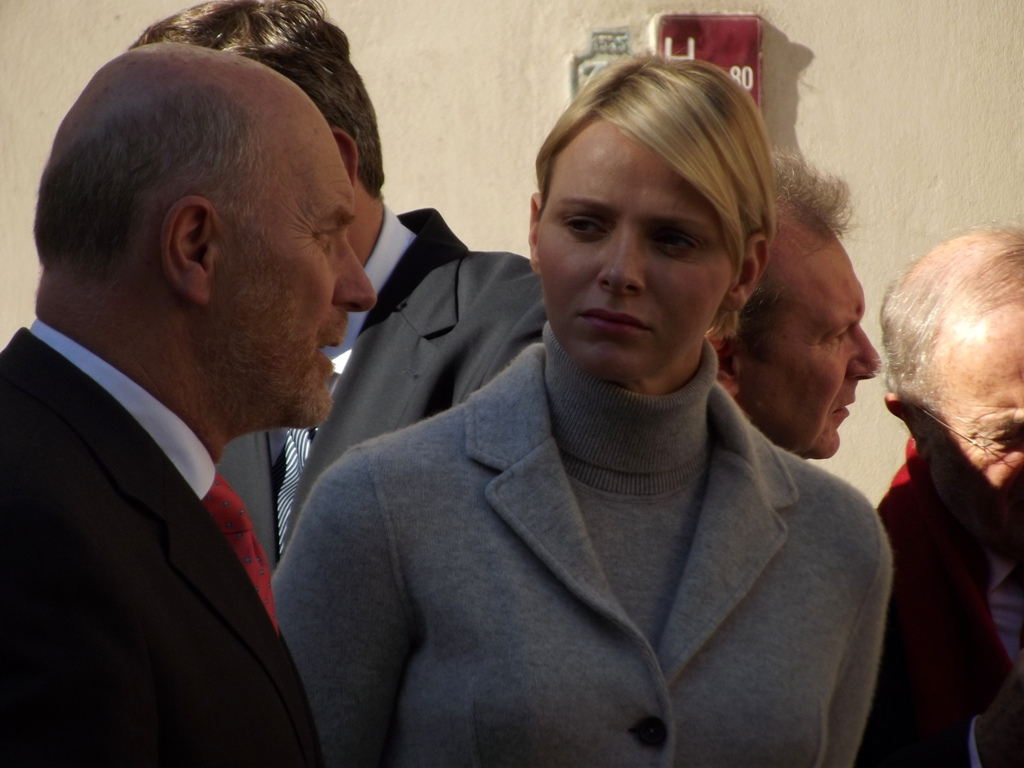
Charlene, Princess of Monaco, a former Olympic swimmer, whose U.S. foundation provided a grant to SWBP during 2018–2019.

The Princess Charlene of Monaco Foundation USA (PCMF USA) provided a grant to SWBP and publicly announced its support for the organization's awareness efforts. The partnership was active during 2018–2019.

=== Swim Teachers Association of the United Kingdom ===
SWBP was selected as a corporate partner by the Swim Teachers Association (STA) of the United Kingdom, which announced the partnership in June 2018. Executive Director Dean E. Haller delivered an hour-long workshop at the STA's Annual Conference on October 6 via GoToMeeting. STA Events and Media Manager Ravinder Sandhu coordinated the presentation, and UK Ambassador Ali Beckman introduced and facilitated the session.

=== Association of Aquatic Professionals ===
SWBP entered a formal partnership with the Association of Aquatic Professionals (AOAP) to advance awareness of underwater hypoxic blackout within professional aquatics settings.

=== National Interscholastic Swim Coaches Association ===
SWBP partnered with the National Interscholastic Swim Coaches Association (NISCA) to distribute educational resources to interscholastic swim coaches and student athletes across the United States.

=== United States Coast Guard ===
SWBP documented that the United States Coast Guard Air Station Miami formally incorporated shallow water blackout education into its training protocols. Prior to beginning water training, each new trainee is required to read and sign a form explaining the dangers of shallow water blackout, with a policy that any trainee who hyperventilates is removed from training.

=== Other partners ===
Additional partners include The Redwoods Group and the Medical Fitness Association (MFA). Aquatic safety expert Tom Griffiths — founder of the Aquatic Safety Research Group and longtime faculty member at Penn State University — has served on the organization's board of directors since its founding.

In 2024, UHBP announced a partnership with the family and friends of Virgil M. Price III, a 39-year-old West Palm Beach freediver who disappeared on Mother's Day 2024 while diving near the Halsey Shipwreck in St. Lucie County, Florida. The U.S. Coast Guard conducted a search but suspended it within a day. Price, who could hold his breath for approximately five minutes, had been preparing to compete at the world freediving championships in Greece when he disappeared.

In November 2025, UHBP co-hosted a "Build a Reef, Save a Life" fundraiser to create the Virgil M. Price Memorial Reef — an artificial reef to be donated to the Palm Beach County Reef Program. A follow-up fundraiser was held at Trevini Ristorante in Palm Beach in November 2025. Proceeds exceeding event costs were designated for both UHBP and the Palm Beach County Reef Program, with reef deployment targeted for summer 2027, pending state and federal permitting.

== Government recognition ==
With the efforts of UHBP, Georgia Governor Nathan Deal signed a proclamation designating May 31 as Shallow Water Blackout Prevention Awareness Day in the state of Georgia. On May 31, 2019, Governor Brian Kemp signed a second proclamation reaffirming the designation and characterizing the condition as an "unexpected killer".

== Media coverage ==
=== Television and broadcast ===
CNN /Sanjay Gupta — Sanjay Gupta, MD featured Rhonda Milner in a nationally broadcast health segment, warning that shallow water blackout "puts even the most fit athletes in danger." Milner described the founding of her organization and the warning signs swimmers and coaches should recognize. The segment was archived on CNN's YouTube channel.

ABC News / Good Morning America — Good Morning America covered the dangers of shallow water blackout and featured aquatic safety expert Tom Griffiths, with SWBP's "No Long Breath Holding" poolside signs prominently displayed throughout the segment.

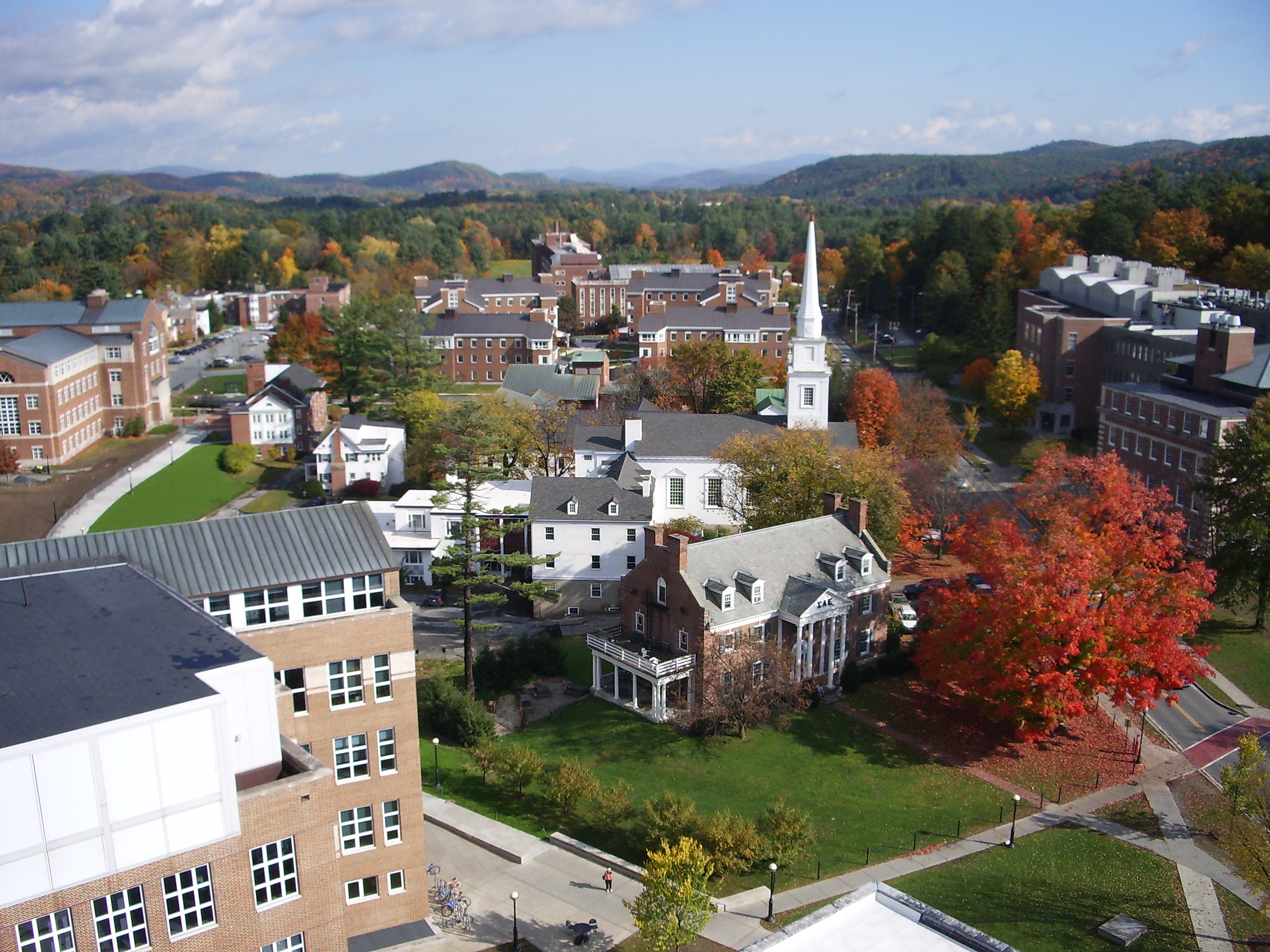
Dartmouth College, attended by Tate Ramsden, whose death in December 2015 drew national media attention to the dangers of shallow water blackout.

ABC News (national) — Following the December 2015 death of Tate Ramsden, a 21-year-old Dartmouth College swimmer who died at a YMCA in Sarasota, Florida after attempting four pool lengths without breathing, ABC News interviewed Milner. She called his death "another tragic event; it's completely preventable" and warned that elite swimmers are particularly at risk because they are conditioned to override the body's natural urge to breathe. Ramsden had completed 4,000 yards of lap swimming before attempting a technique known as a "100" — four pool lengths without surfacing for air — according to a Sarasota County Sheriff's Office incident report.

NBC News — NBC News covered the dangers of shallow water blackout in a May 2023 segment titled "Shallow Water Blackout Poses a Silent and Undetected Risk for Swimmers."

WUSA9 (Washington, D.C.) — WUSA9 reported on the August 2022 Don't Hold Your Breath PSA launch with the Michael Phelps Foundation.

CBS12 (West Palm Beach, Florida) — CBS12 covered UHBP's November 2025 "Build a Reef, Save a Life" fundraising event, held to honor freediver Virgil Price III, who disappeared on Mother's Day 2024 while diving near the Halsey Shipwreck off the Florida coast.

WFLX Fox 29 (West Palm Beach, Florida) — WFLX covered the Virgil Price III memorial reef project in May 2025, including an interview with Dr. Milner, who described UHB as the leading cause of death among experienced swimmers and emphasized that there is no warning before a blackout occurs.

ABC News Australia — The Australian edition of ABC News covered the dangers of breath-holding in domestic pools, featuring the family of victim Jack MacMillan in a report shared by SWBP.

=== Print and digital ===
USA Today — Published a health and wellness feature on shallow water blackout in January 2023.

Swimming World Magazine — Swimming World has featured SWBP in multiple articles. A May 2015 feature titled "Shallow Water Blackout: The Silent Killer of Swimmers" described Dr. Milner's outreach at the 2014 American Swimming Coaches Association World Clinic and noted that USA Swimming, British Swimming, and Swimming Australia had issued official safety warnings in response to growing public awareness. A separate feature discussed the physiological risks of hypoxic training sets in competitive swimming and credited Milner's website as the leading online resource for prevention information.

Palm Beach Daily News (USA TODAY Network) — Reported on the January 2026 "Save a Reef, Save a Life" fundraiser at Trevini Ristorante in Palm Beach, Florida, which raised money for the Virgil M. Price Memorial Reef and UHBP. The planned reef will feature a likeness of Price, his dogs, personal mementos, and a donor plaque also recognizing other victims including Whitner Milner.

Emory University School of Medicine — Dr. Milner and SWBP were featured in a profile by the Emory University School of Medicine, her alma mater.

=== Honors ===
The Milner family was formally honored at a Miami Heat game in recognition of their public safety advocacy work.

== See also ==
- Shallow-water blackout
- Freediving
- Freediving blackout
- Hyperventilation
- Michael Phelps Foundation
- Water safety
