= Timothy L. Fort =

American economist and ethicist

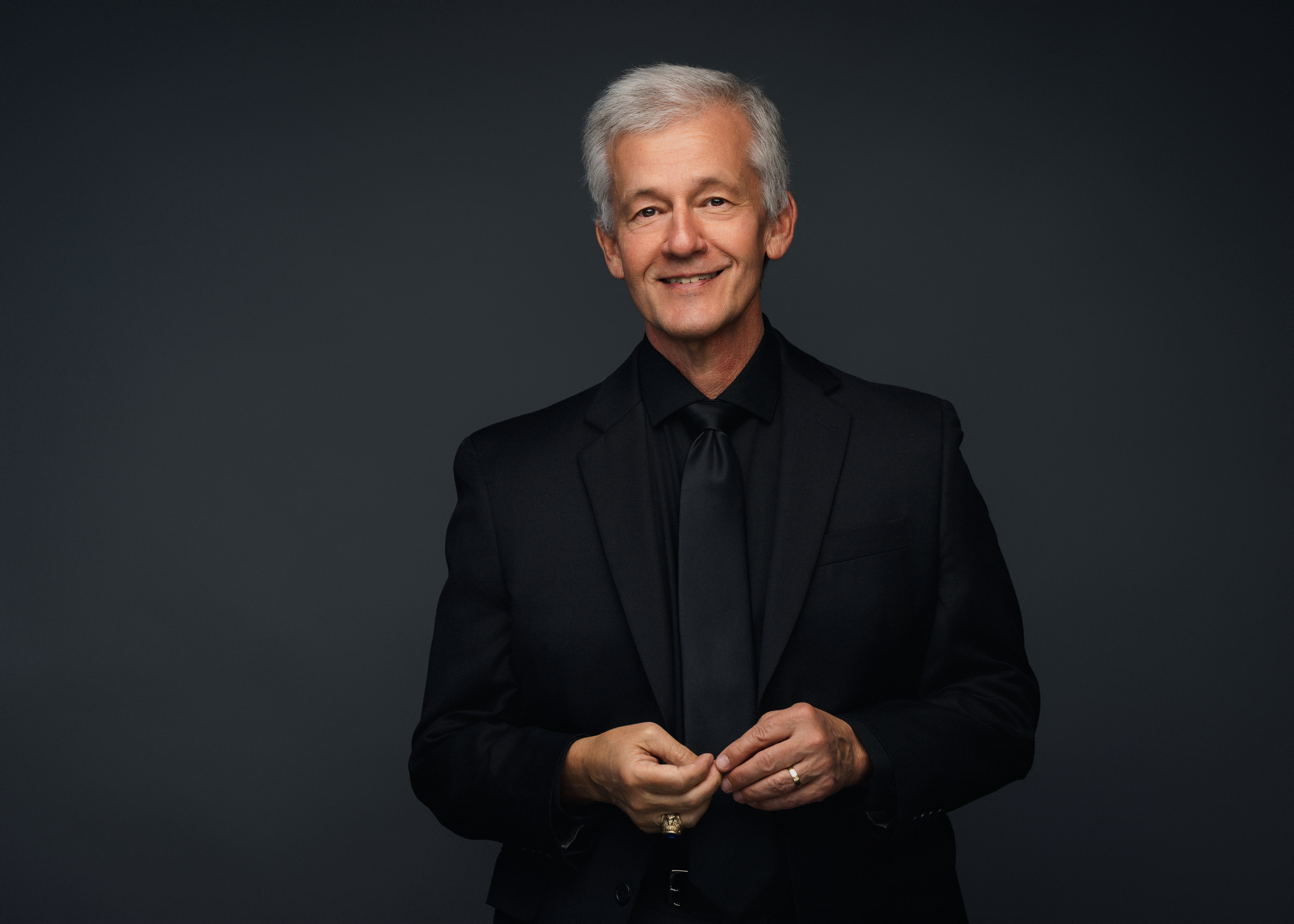
- Professional headshot of Timothy L. Fort
- Born: 1958 (age 67–68)
- Education: University of Notre Dame, Northwestern University
- Occupations: University teacher, economist, ethicist
- Employers: George Washington University (2005–2013); Kelley School of Business (2013–); University of Michigan (1994–2005)
- Known for: Academic specializing in business ethics

Timothy L. Fort (born 1958) is an American legal scholar, business ethicist, and peacebuilding researcher. He holds the Eveleigh Endowed Chair in Business Ethics at the Kelley School of Business at Indiana University. He is recognized as a founder of the academic field of business and peace.

== Education ==
Fort received a Bachelor of Arts and Master of Arts from the University of Notre Dame and both a Juris Doctor and a Doctor of Philosophy in Theology from Northwestern University. This interdisciplinary formation spanning law, theology, political science, ethics, and management has defined a scholarly career at the intersection of corporate governance, business ethics, international relations, and conflict prevention.

== Academic career ==
Fort began his academic career at the University of Michigan (1994–2005), where he held the Bank One Assistant Professorship and progressed through the full tenure and promotion track to full professor. He then served as the Lindner-Gambal Chair in Business Ethics at the George Washington University School of Business (2005–2013), where he founded and directed the Institute for Corporate Responsibility, served as Department Chair of Strategic Management and Public Policy, and as Interim Associate Dean for the Undergraduate Program. Since 2013, he has held the Eveleigh Chair in Business Ethics at Indiana University's Kelley School of Business, where he coordinated the Undergraduate Ethics Program from 2013 to 2024, and led its evolution to become the largest business ethics faculty in the world. From 2022 to 2024, he was an Affiliated Scholar and Adjunct Professor at the Kroc Institute for International Peace Studies at the University of Notre Dame. He has also held fellowships at the Business Roundtable Ethics Institute and the William Davidson Institute.

Fort has authored fifteen books and edited an additional twenty-five pedagogical works, with major publications through Cambridge University Press, Stanford University Press, Oxford University Press, and Yale University Press. He has published more than one hundred articles, book chapters, and book reviews, and has served on the editorial boards of the Academy of Management Review, Business Ethics Quarterly, and the American Business Law Journal the flagship journals of the three primary academic associations in his field.

== Scholarship ==
Fort's early work reconceptualized the business corporation as a mediating institution a community embedded in broader social norms drawn from natural law and bioanthropology integrating empirical findings from human neurobiology with normative frameworks for ethical conduct. This framework, developed in Ethics and Governance: Business as Mediating Institution (Oxford University Press, 2001), synthesized leading theories of business ethics and introduced a tripartite model of trust: Hard Trust (legal compliance), Real Trust (cultural integrity grounded in natural law and justice), and Good Trust (individual moral agency through meaningful work).

His subsequent work established the field of business and peace. Co-authored with Cindy A. Schipani, The Role of Business in Fostering Peaceful Societies (Cambridge University Press, 2004) is regarded as a foundational text in peacebuilding research within management scholarship. Fort co-chaired a task force on business and peace with the U.S. Institute of Peace, partnered with the U.S. State Department on a program placing MBA students as pro bono consultants to entrepreneurs in conflict-sensitive zones, and has presented his research to the United Nations Working Group on Business and Peace as well as the United States’ Council of Foreign Relations.

Business, Integrity, and Peace (Cambridge University Press, 2007) won the Academy of Management's Best Book Award for Social Issues in Management in 2010. The Diplomat in the Corner Office: Corporate Foreign Policy (Stanford University Press, 2015) won the same award in 2016, providing a framework for how multinational corporations contribute to peace through peacemaking, peacekeeping, and peacebuilding. Fort is among very few scholars to have won this award twice. The Sincerity Edge: How Ethical Leaders Build Dynamic Businesses (Stanford University Press, 2017), co-authored with Alexandra Christina, Countess of Frederiksborg, was a finalist for the same award in 2018.

Fort's most recent research develops the concept of "Cultural Foundations of Peace," examining how cultural artifacts including music, sports, and film function as behavioral nudges toward ethical decision-making and as bridges across social and political division. This work has involved collaboration with the Jacobs School of Music at Indiana University, the IU Cinema, and Kristin Hahn, Executive Producer of Apple TV's The Morning Show.

== Recognition ==
Fort received the Distinguished Career Faculty Award from the Academy of Legal Studies in Business in 2022. He was nominated for the Nobel Peace Prize in both 2024 and 2025 for his work demonstrating how business organizations can serve as a positive force for sustainable peace. He has received more than twelve research awards across three academic associations the Academy of Management, the Society for Business Ethics, and the Academy of Legal Studies in Business as well as six teaching awards, including the Indiana University Trustees' Teaching Award (2018).

Fort served as Academic Director of an MBA program designed for current and former professional athletes, with a particular focus on NFL players, and co-taught with then-Federal Reserve Chair Ben Bernanke. He has taught Nobel Peace Prize laureate Jerry White (co-founder of the International Campaign to Ban Landmines), and co-authored two works with Alexandra Christina, Countess of Frederiksborg, whom he has also advised in her role as a member of the Board of Directors of Ferring Pharmaceuticals.

== Governance and institutional leadership ==
Beyond his academic appointments, Fort has held a number of governing and advisory board positions. He has served on the Governing Board of Fort Family Farms, a family business partnership in Stronghurst, Illinois, since 2000. He served on the Kelley Executive Education Foundation board from 2014 to 2022, the Indiana University Cinema Advisory Board from 2016 to 2022, the Old National Bank Advisory Board from 2016 to 2018, and the Executive Board of the Institute for Corporate Responsibility in Washington, D.C., from 2006 to 2013. He has served on the Peace Through Commerce Advisory Board in Austin, Texas, since 2012.

== Awards and honors ==
- 2010, Academy of Management's Best Book Award in the area of Social Issues in Management (SIM) for Business, Integrity, and Peace (2007).
- 2016, Academy of Management's Best Book Award in the area of Social Issues in Management (SIM) for The Diplomat in the Corner Office: Corporate Foreign Policy (2015).
- 2022, Distinguished Career Faculty Award of the Academy of Legal Studies in Business
- 2024, Fort nominated for the 2024 Nobel Peace Prize.

== Bibliography ==
- Fort, Timothy L. (1987). Law and Religion. Jefferson, N.C: McFarland. ISBN 0899502652.
- Fort, Timothy L. (2001). Ethics and Governance: Business as Mediating Institution. Oxford New York: Oxford University Press. ISBN 0195137604.
- Fort, Timothy L.; Schipani, Cindy A. (2004). The Role of Business in Fostering Peaceful Societies. Cambridge: Cambridge University Press. ISBN 0521832624.
- Fort, Timothy L. (2007). Business, Integrity, and Peace: Beyond Geopolitical and Disciplinary Boundaries. Cambridge: Cambridge University Press. ISBN 9780521862981.
- Fort, Timothy L. (2008). Prophets, Profits, and Peace: The Positive Role of Business in Promoting Religious Tolerance. New Haven: Yale University Press. ISBN 9780300114676.
- Fort, Timothy L., ed. (2011). Peace Through Commerce: A Multisectoral Approach. Dordrecht: Springer Netherlands. ISBN 9789400702363.
- Fort, Timothy L. (2014). The Vision of the Firm: Its Governance, Obligations, and Aspirations. St. Paul, MN: West Academic Publishing. ISBN 9780314286499.
- Fort, Timothy L. (2015). The Diplomat in the Corner Office: Corporate Foreign Policy. Stanford, California: Stanford Business Books. ISBN 9780804786379.
- Frederiksborg, Alexandra von; Fort, Timothy L. (2017). The Sincerity Edge: How Ethical Leaders Build Dynamic Businesses. Stanford: Stanford University Press. ISBN 9780804797450.
