= Academy of Legal Studies in Business =

American academic association

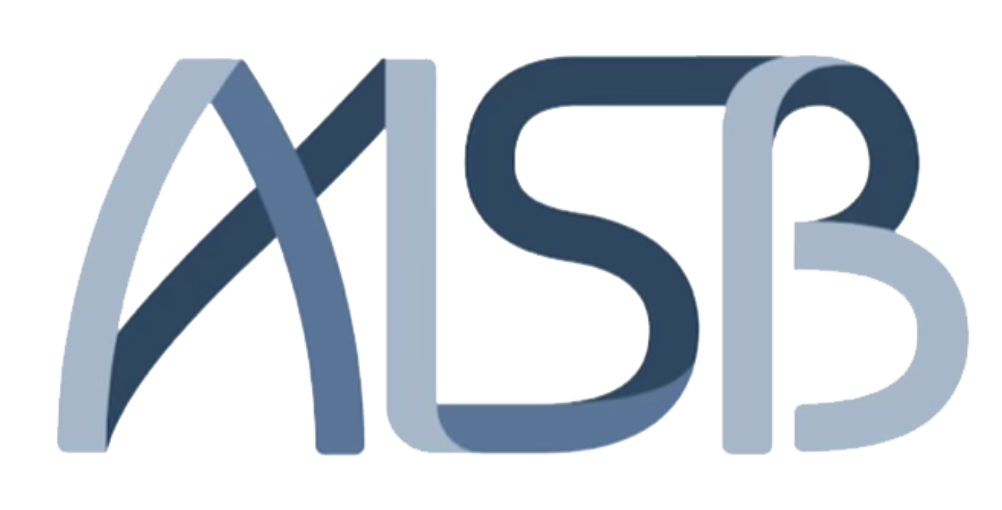
2022 Logo

The Academy of Legal Studies in Business is an American-based professional association for teachers and scholars in the fields of business, law, legal environment, and law-related courses outside of professional law schools. It was founded in 1924, and now has an international membership. The nearly 1,000 members teach primarily in schools of business in colleges and universities, at both the undergraduate and graduate levels. Members come from all fifty states, Canada, Australia, New Zealand, Ireland, England, and a number of other nations.

The Academy provides a forum for the exchange of ideas, and encourages support and cooperation among those who teach and conduct research in the field of legal studies. The Academy publishes two top-tier journals: the American Business Law Journal (ABLJ) and the Journal of Legal Studies Education (JLSE). For new faculty members in business law fields, the organization offers a Mentorship Program that pairs new ALSB members with experienced teachers and researchers.

The ALSB hosts an annual conference for members to share their scholarly works and teaching innovations. Upcoming conference locations include San Diego (2023) and Washington, DC (2024).

In addition to international events, the organization has twelve related regional organizations which host annual meetings. Several of the regional organizations also sponsor academic journals.
