= November Project =

Free and open-to-the-public exercise group

Logo of the November Project

The November Project is a free, open-to-the-public exercise group founded in Boston, Massachusetts, in 2011. The name "November Project" comes from the Google Doc that the founders shared to track their progress in November 2011. While sessions occur year-round, the name stuck.

== History ==
Founded by Brogan Graham and Bojan Mandaric, both Northeastern crew alumni, the group was started as a way to keep working out through Boston's cold winter months. The pair made a pact to continue to meet at 6:30 am every day through the month of November.

The group grew to hundreds of members who exercise multiple times a week in a number of cities around the United States, Canada, Asia and Europe. Membership is open and free to the general public. Various media outlets discussed or featured photos of the club, including Runner's World magazine, the Boston Globe, and NPR.

The group selected specific locations within the city of Boston (as well as immediate communities such as Brookline and Cambridge) for its workouts. The standard locations include Harvard Stadium for its stairs, and Corey Hill Outlook Park (also known as "Summit Ave.") in Brookline.

== Locations ==
As of June 1, 2022, November Project was active in 58 locations across the world:

Location Name	Location	Start date	Pre-NP name	Ref
November Project Boston	Boston, Massachusetts	11 November 2011		
November Project Madison	Madison, Wisconsin	13 February 2013		
November Project San Francisco	San Francisco, California	1 May 2013		
November Project Canada	Edmonton, Alberta	11 September 2013		
November Project Denver	Denver, Colorado	23 October 2013		
November Project DC	Washington, D.C.	23 October 2013		
November Project San Diego	San Diego, California	23 October 2013		
November Project Baltimore	Baltimore, Maryland	15 January 2014		
November Project Philadelphia	Philadelphia, Pennsylvania	15 January 2014		
November Project Indianapolis	Indianapolis, Indiana	15 January 2014		
November Project New York	New York City	5 March 2014		
November Project Los Angeles	Los Angeles, California	5 March 2014		
November Project Milwaukee	Milwaukee, Wisconsin	5 March 2014		
November Project Minneapolis	Minneapolis, Minnesota	5 March 2014		
November Project New Orleans	New Orleans, Louisiana	16 April 2014		
November Project Chicago	Chicago, Illinois	14 May 2014		
November Project Winnipeg	Winnipeg, Manitoba	6 March 2015	WPG Gone Rogue	
November Project Calgary	Calgary, Alberta	9 March 2015	Calgary Fit Mob	
November Project Virginia Beach	Virginia Beach, Virginia	11 March 2015	Heroic Hearts Project	
November Project Phoenix	Phoenix, Arizona	1 July 2015		
November Project Vancouver	Vancouver, British Columbia	8 July 2015		
November Project Toronto	Toronto, Ontario	26 August 2015	PledgeT.O.Fitness	
November Project Kansas City	Kansas City, Missouri	25 September 2015	Get Moving KC	
November Project Kelowna	Kelowna, British Columbia	25 September 2015	Kelowna Tribe	
November Project Worcester	Worcester, Massachusetts	2 October 2015	Wednesday Workouts - Worcester	
November Project Victoria	Victoria, British Columbia	2 December 2015	Victoria Sweat Project	
November Project Iceland	Reykjavík, Iceland	16 December 2015	Áform	
November Project Novi Sad	Novi Sad, Serbia	15 January 2016	Dobro Jutro	
November Project Seattle	Seattle, Washington	26 March 2016	Gas Works Wednesday Workout	
November Project Amsterdam	Amsterdam, Netherlands	7 September 2016	Amsterdam Fit Project	
November Project London	London, UK	7 September 2016	Hour of Power London	
November Project Hong Kong	Hong Kong	23 October 2016	justshowuphk	
November Project Orlando	Orlando, Florida	2 December 2016	Orlando Fit Project	
November Project Montreal	Montreal, Quebec	12 April 2017	Projet Sweat Montréal	
November Project Dallas	Dallas, Texas	19 April 2017	We Run Big D	
November Project Richmond	Richmond, Virginia	19 April 2017	All The Way Up RVA	
November Project Ottawa	Ottawa, Ontario	3 May 2017	Work it YOW	
November Project Regina	Regina, Saskatchewan	10 May 2017	QueenCity Fit	
November Project Austin	Austin, Texas	10 May 2017	Project Austin	
November Project Brooklyn	Brooklyn, New York	12 May 2017	Kings County Fit Club	
November Project Portland	Portland, Oregon	17 May 2017	PDX Fit Project	
November Project Malaysia	Miri, Malaysia	14 June 2017	Myyfitnessfeat	
November Project Buffalo	Buffalo, New York	21 June 2017	Run This Town 716	
November Project Atlanta	Atlanta, Georgia	18 October 2017	Fitlanta Movement	
November Project Grand Rapids	Grand Rapids, Michigan	27 December 2017	Carpe Diem GR	
November Project West LA	West Los Angeles, California	25 April 2018	Westside Wednesdays	
November Project Syracuse	Syracuse, New York	23 May 2018	Cuse Community Fitness	
November Project Oakland	Oakland, California	23 May 2018	East Bay Free Fitness	
November Project Providence	Providence, Rhode Island	30 May 2018	Providence Project	
November Project Newport	Newport, Rhode Island	30 May 2018	Newport Fit Club	
November Project Rochester	Rochester, New York	17 July 2019	Roc Free Fitness	
November Project Toulouse	Toulouse, France	10 July 2019		
November Project Scioto Mile	Columbus, Ohio	28 Aug 2019	Crushing it Columbus	
November Project WWW	World Wide Web	27 July 2021		
November Project Calgary	Calgary, Alberta	1 June 2022	YYCFitFam	
November Project Maui	Maui, Hawaii	1 June 2022	Maui Project	
November Project Maine	Portland, Maine	1 June 2022	Portland Sweat Project	
November Project Sydney	Sydney, Australia	1 June 2022	Sydney Fitness Project	
November Project Tacoma	Tacoma, Washington	1 June 2022	The Tacoma Project	

== Bibliography ==
- Rubin, Courtney (March 25, 2015), "The Early-Morning Workout Flash Mob", The New York Times
- MacVean, Mary (October 10, 2015), "How hugs make everything better, even running the stairs at the Hollywood Bowl", Los Angeles Times
- Muther, Christopher (November 15, 2012), November Project members embrace exercise, one another, The Boston Globe
- Daniloff, Caleb (November 8, 2013), Hug, Sweat & Cheers, Runner's World
- Tsong, Nicole (January 18, 2016), The November Project is a great idea, if you like 6:29 a.m. winter workouts outside, The Seattle Times
- Young, Bob (October 1, 2015), November Project fitness group blossoms in Phoenix, The Arizona Republic
- Earle, Caroline (March 20, 2015), The North Face Is Partnering with the November Project, BostInno
- Hallett, Vicky (September 16, 2014), "November Project: Hugs and fitness", The Washington Post
- Atwood, Kylie (September 30, 2014), November Project: More than a fitness movement, CBS News
- Earle, Caroline (January 28, 2015), Apparently the November Project Really Is Weatherproof, BostInno
- Salz, Allison (July 3, 2014), Oilers' captain Andrew Ference's November Project gaining popularity in Edmonton, Edmonton Sun
- Tappen, Kathryn (October 12, 2013), Tapped In: Ference talks Oilers, November Project, NHL.com, archived from the original on March 2, 2016
- Malamut, Melissa (July 9, 2013), New Balance Launches Ad Campaign With Local Runners, Boston Magazine
- Willey, David (November 7, 2013), Strength in Numbers, Runner's World
