= Shallow-water blackout =

Loss of consciousness at a shallow depth during a dive

Shallow-water blackout is loss of consciousness at a shallow depth due to hypoxia during a dive, which could be the result of any one of significantly differing causative circumstances. The term is ambiguous, and the depth range in which it may occur is generally shallow relative to the preceding part of the dive, but also occurring when the entire dive takes place at an almost constant depth within a few metres of the surface. Various situations may be referred to as shallow water blackout but differ in how the hypoxia is induced: Some occur in a context of freediving, others occur during ascent while scuba diving, usually when using a rebreather, and occasionally while surface-supplied diving.

== Freediving ==
Two very different breathhold dive profiles can lead to hypoxic blackout at shallow depth.

=== At constant depth ===
Blackout may occur when all phases of a breathhold dive have taken place in shallow water, where depressurisation during ascent is not a significant factor, and the blackout may occur without warning before the diver attempts to surface. The mechanism for this type of shallow water blackout is lack of arterial oxygen expedited by low carbon dioxide levels, as a consequence of voluntary hyperventilation before the dive. Blackouts which occur in swimming pools are probably driven only by excessive hyperventilation, with no significant influence from pressure change. There is broad agreement among diving physiologists to call this shallow water blackout or constant pressure blackout.

=== During ascent ===
Blackout can occur during ascent from a deep freedive or immediately after surfacing. This is due to a relatively rapidly lowered oxygen partial pressure caused by a reduction in ambient pressure after much of the available arterial oxygen has been used up at the higher partial pressures induced by depth, leaving the diver in a state of latent hypoxia, with actual cerebral hypoxia inevitable during ascent. Blackout in the shallow stage of ascent from deep free-dives is less ambiguously called "ascent blackout", or unambiguously "freediving blackout of ascent", and has also sometimes been called "deep water blackout", which is also an ambiguous term, being used by some authors for loss of consciousness that occurs at depths of greater than about 60 metres (200 ft) when breathing air, hypothetically as a consequence of nitrogen narcosis, oxygen toxicity, or both.

== Scuba and surface-supplied diving ==
One of the hazards of rebreather diving is a hypoxic loss of consciousness while ascending because of a sudden uncompensated drop of oxygen partial pressure in the breathing loop. This occurs as a result of the pressure reduction during ascent, usually associated with manually controlled closed circuit rebreathers and semi-closed circuit rebreathers, (also known as gas extenders), which do not use automatic feedback from the measured oxygen partial pressure to control the mixture in the loop. A similar effect can occur in open circuit scuba and surface-supplied diving if a diver continues to breathe a hypoxic gas intended for avoiding oxygen toxicity in the deep sector, at a depth shallower than the minimum operating depth for the gas, but this is usually just called hypoxia.

== See also ==
- Underwater Hypoxic Blackout Prevention
