= Left marginal artery =

Branch of the circumflex artery in the heart

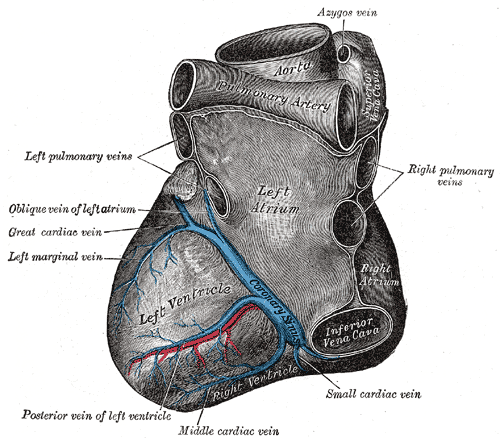
- Base and diaphragmatic surface of heart. (Left marginal artery not visible, but would be near center left.)

- ARTERIES: RCA = right coronary AB = atrial branches SANB = sinuatrial nodal RMA = right marginal LCA = left coronary CB = circumflex branch LAD/AIB = anterior interventricular LMA = left marginal PIA/PDA = posterior descending AVN = atrioventricular nodal VEINS: SCV = small cardiac ACV = anterior cardiac AIV/GCV = great cardiac MCV = middle cardiac CS = coronary sinus

Details
- Source: Circumflex artery
- Vein: Left marginal vein
- Supplies: Left ventricle

Identifiers
- Latin: ramus marginalis sinister arteriae coronariae sinistrae
- TA98: A12.2.03.209
- TA2: 4152
- FMA: 3902

The left marginal artery (or obtuse marginal artery) is a branch of the circumflex artery, originating at the left atrioventricular sulcus, traveling along the left margin of heart towards the apex of the heart.

== See also ==
- Right marginal branch of right coronary artery

== Additional images ==
Coronary arteries (labeled in red text) and other major landmarks (in blue text). Left marginal artery is labeled at right.
