= Right marginal branch of right coronary artery =

Artery

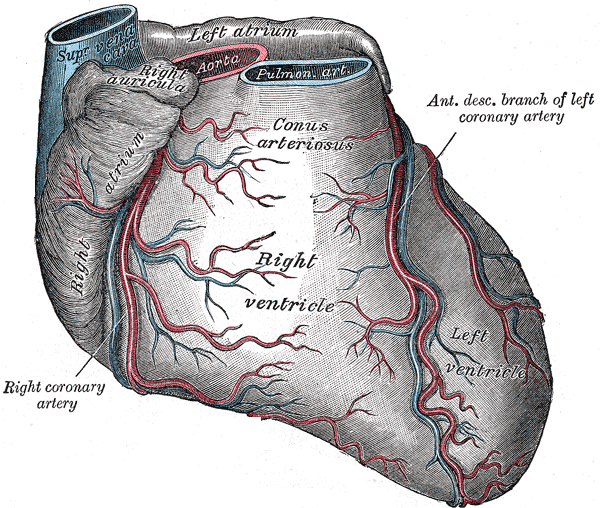
- Sternocostal surface of heart. (Right marginal artery not labeled, but is visible at bottom left.)

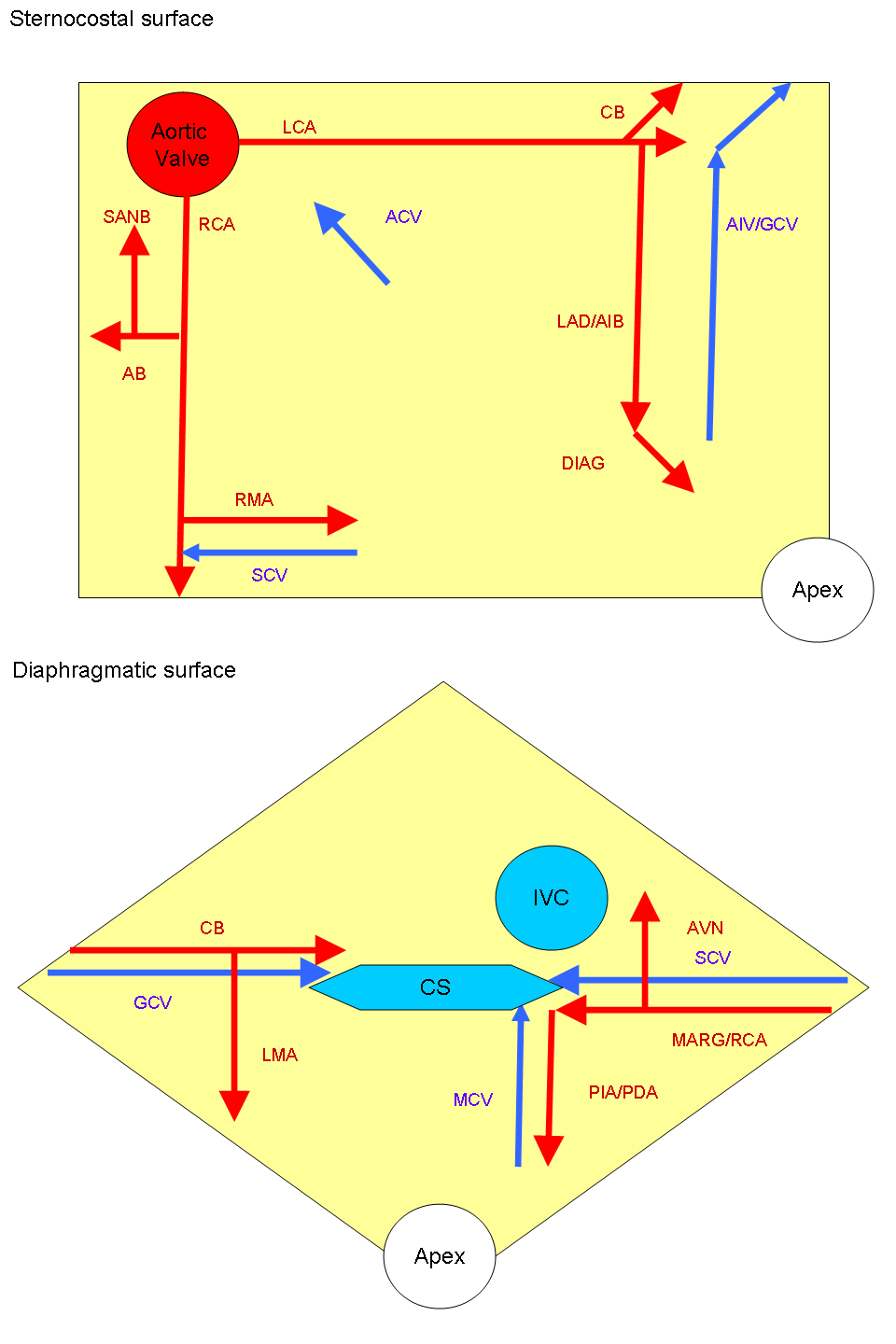
- ARTERIES: RCA = right coronary AB = atrial branches SANB = sinuatrial nodal RMA = right marginal LCA = left coronary CB = circumflex branch LAD/AIB = anterior interventricular LMA = left marginal PIA/PDA = posterior descending MARG = left marginal AVN = atrioventricular nodal VEINS: SCV = small cardiac ACV = anterior cardiac AIV/GCV = great cardiac MCV = middle cardiac CS = coronary sinus

Details
- Source: right coronary artery
- Vein: right marginal vein

Identifiers
- Latin: ramus marginalis dexter arteriae coronariae dextrae
- TA98: A12.2.03.106
- TA2: 4137
- FMA: 3818

The right marginal branch of right coronary artery (or right marginal artery) is the largest marginal branch of the right coronary artery. It follows the acute margin of the heart. It supplies blood to both surfaces of the right ventricle.

== Structure ==
The right marginal branch is the largest branch to split off from the right coronary artery. It often anastomoses with the nearby parallel posterior interventricular artery, which itself is usually a continuation of the right coronary artery.

=== Variation ===
The right marginal branch may reach the distal part of the posterior interventricular sulcus.

== Function ==
The right marginal branch primarily supplies the right ventricle.

== Additional images ==
Coronary arteries (labeled in red text) and other major landmarks (in blue text). Right (acute) marginal artery is labeled at left in the image.

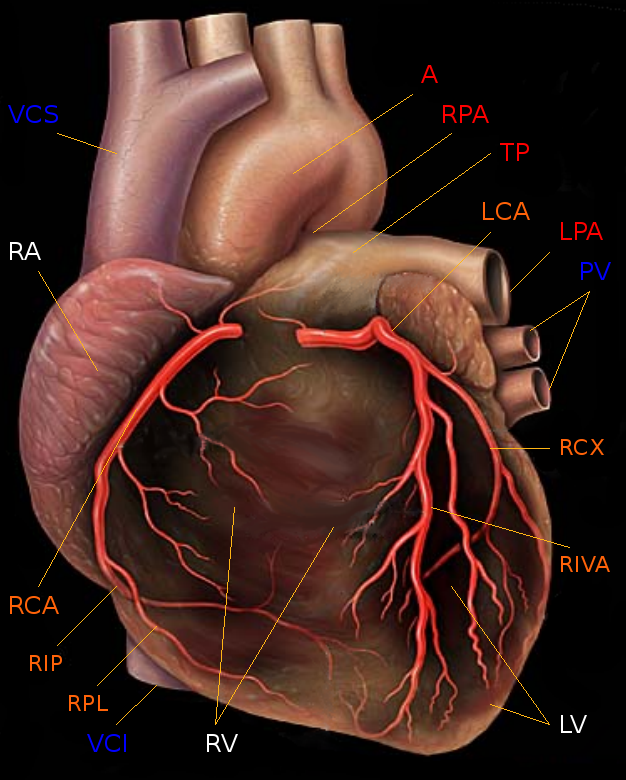
Human heart with coronary arteries
