= Anterior cardiac veins =

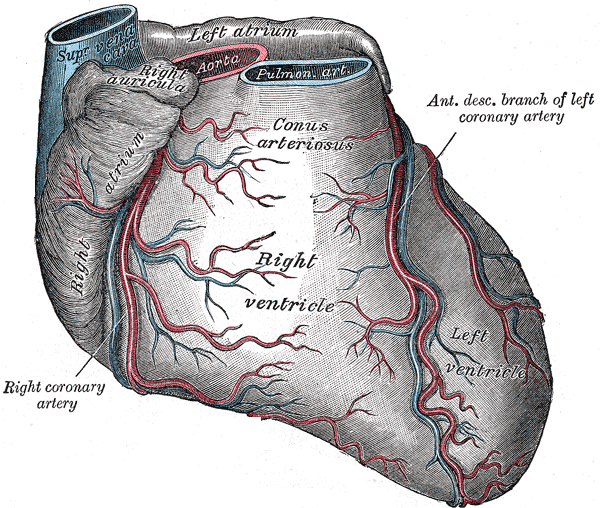
- Sternocostal surface of heart. (Anterior cardiac veins not labeled, but visible at left.)

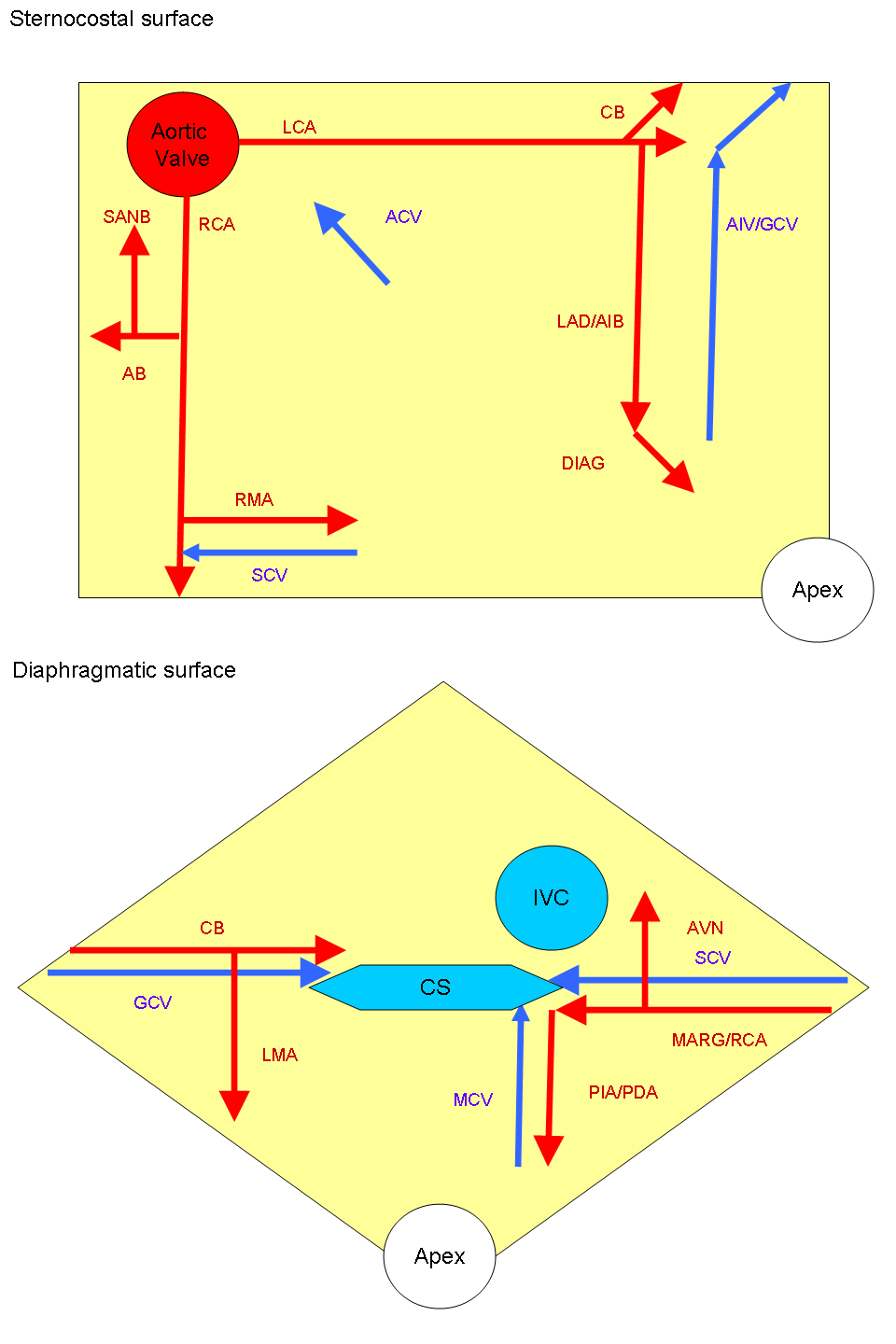
- Arteries: RCA = right coronary AB = atrial branches SANB = sinuatrial nodal RMA = right marginal LCA = left coronary CB = circumflex branch LAD/AIB = anterior interventricular LMA = left marginal PIA/PDA = posterior descending AVN = atrioventricular nodal Veins: SCV = small cardiac ACV = anterior cardiac AIV/GCV = great cardiac MCV = middle cardiac CS = coronary sinus

Details
- Drains to: Right atrium

Identifiers
- Latin: venae cardiacae anteriores, venae ventriculi dextri anteriores
- TA98: A12.3.01.012
- TA2: 4168
- FMA: 71567

The anterior cardiac veins (or anterior veins of right ventricle) are a variable number of small veins (usually 2-5) which drain blood from the anterior portion of the right ventricle into the right atrium.

== Anatomy ==
The right marginal vein frequently opens into the right atrium, and is therefore sometimes regarded as belonging to this group.

=== Fate ===
Unlike most cardiac veins, the anterior cardiac veins do not end in the coronary sinus; instead, they drain directly into the anterior wall of the right atrium.
