= Atrial branches of coronary arteries =

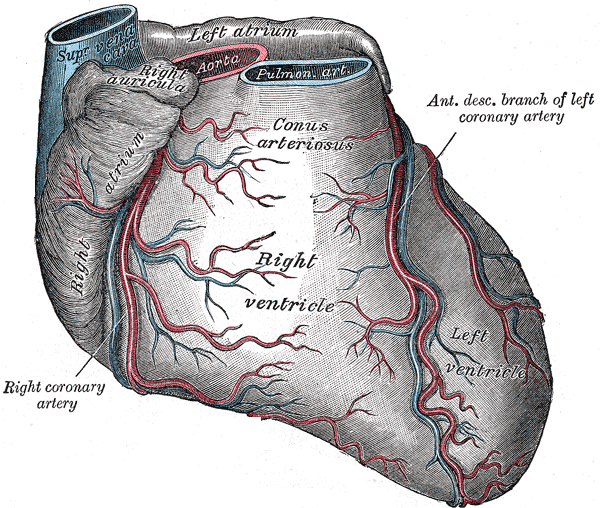
- Sternocostal surface of heart.

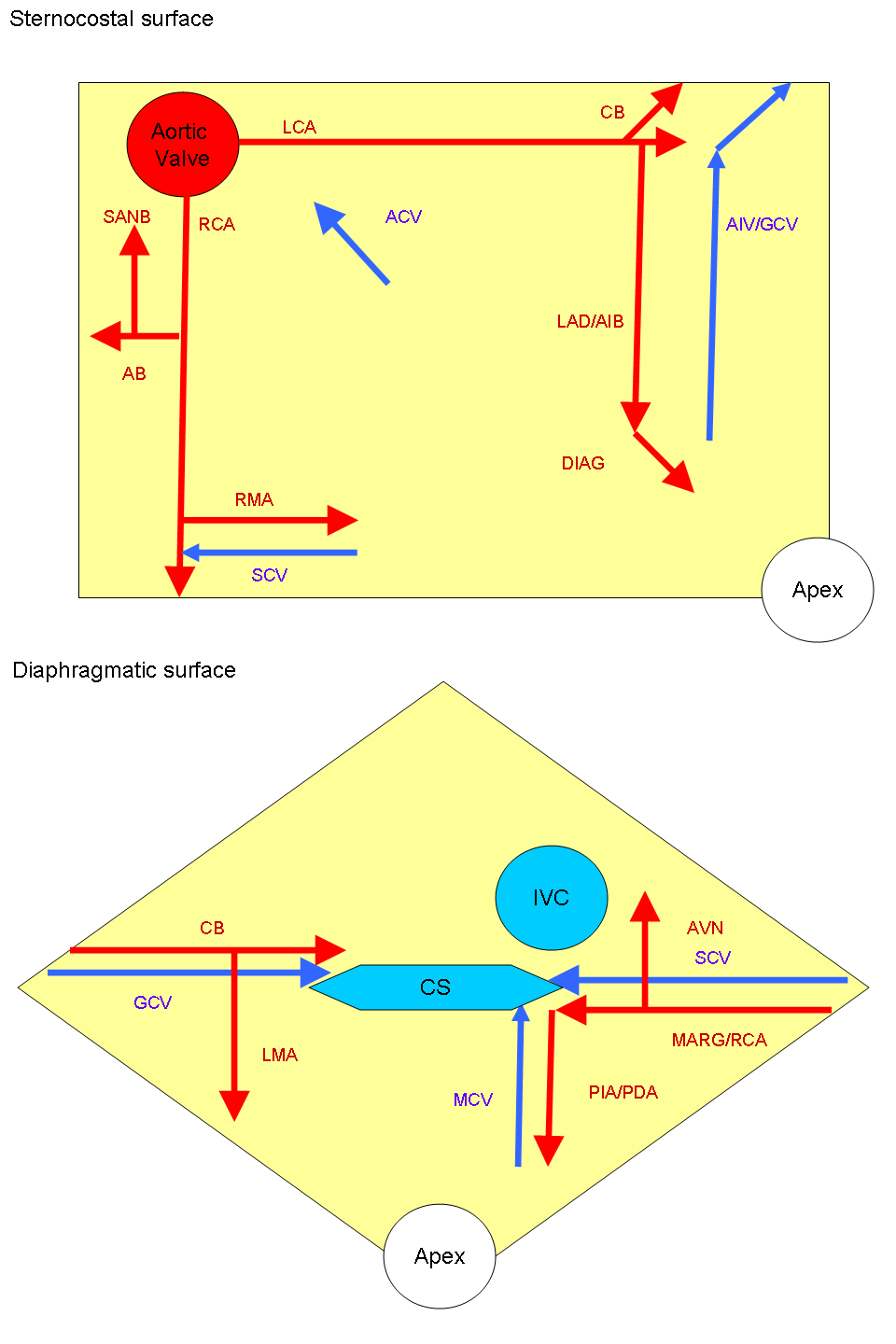
- ARTERIES: RCA = right coronary AB = atrial branches SANB = sinuatrial nodal RMA = right marginal LCA = left coronary CB = circumflex branch LAD/AIB = anterior interventricular LMA = left marginal PIA/PDA = posterior descending MARG = left marginal AVN = atrioventricular nodal VEINS: SCV = small cardiac ACV = anterior cardiac AIV/GCV = great cardiac MCV = middle cardiac CS = coronary sinus

Details
- Source: right coronary artery

Identifiers
- Latin: rami atriales arteriae coronariae dextrae
- TA98: A12.2.03.105
- TA2: 4134
- FMA: 71668

The atrial branches of right coronary artery derive from the right coronary artery and provide part of the blood supply to the right atrium and left atrium.

Although named for the right coronary artery in Terminologia anatomica, a portion of the blood supply to the atria derives from the Circumflex branch of left coronary artery.
