= Cardiac veins =

Cardiac veins can refer to:

- Coronary sinus
- Great cardiac vein (also known as the left coronary vein)
- Middle cardiac vein
- Small cardiac vein (also known as the right coronary vein)
- Smallest cardiac veins (also known as the Thebesean veins)
- Anterior cardiac veins
