= Atrioventricular nodal branch =

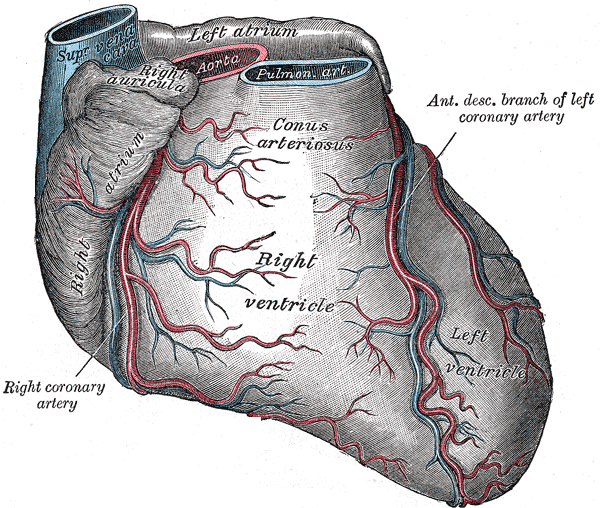
- Sternocostal surface of heart.

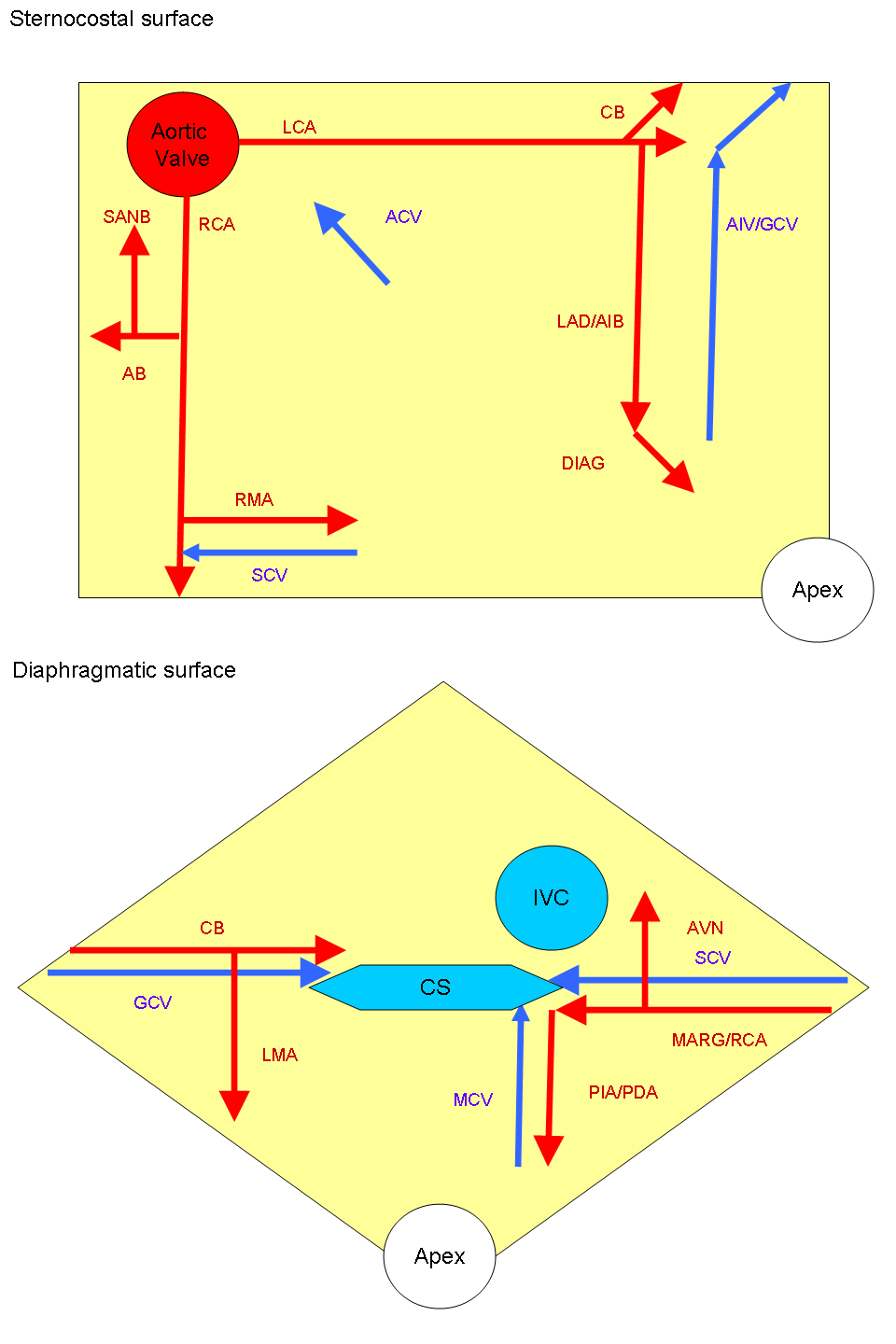
- ARTERIES: RCA = right coronary AB = atrial branches SANB = sinuatrial nodal RMA = right marginal LCA = left coronary CB = circumflex branch LAD/AIB = anterior interventricular LMA = left marginal PIA/PDA = posterior descending AVN = atrioventricular nodal VEINS: SCV = small cardiac ACV = anterior cardiac AIV/GCV = great cardiac MCV = middle cardiac CS = coronary sinus

Details

Identifiers
- Latin: ramus nodi atrioventricularis
- TA98: A12.2.03.110
- TA2: 4140
- FMA: 3851

The atrioventricular nodal branch is a coronary artery that supplies arterial blood to the atrioventricular node, which is responsible for initiating muscular contraction of the ventricles. The AV nodal branch is most often a branch of the right coronary artery.

== Structure ==
=== Origin ===
The atrioventricular nodal branch sees significant variation in origin:

- proximal posterolateral branch from the right coronary artery in around 77%.
- distal posterolateral branch from the right coronary artery in around 2%.
- distal right coronary artery in around 10%.
- right posterior interventricular artery in around 7%.
- distal circumflex branch of left coronary artery in around 4%.

The right coronary artery supplies the atrioventricular node in around 90% of people.

In approximately 2% of people, the vascular supply to the atrioventricular node arises from both the right coronary artery and the left circumflex branch.

== Function ==
The atrioventricular nodal branch supplies the atrioventricular node, allowing for excitation of the ventricles.

== See also ==
- Coronary circulation
