= Sinoatrial nodal artery =

Artery of the heart which supplies the sinoatrial node

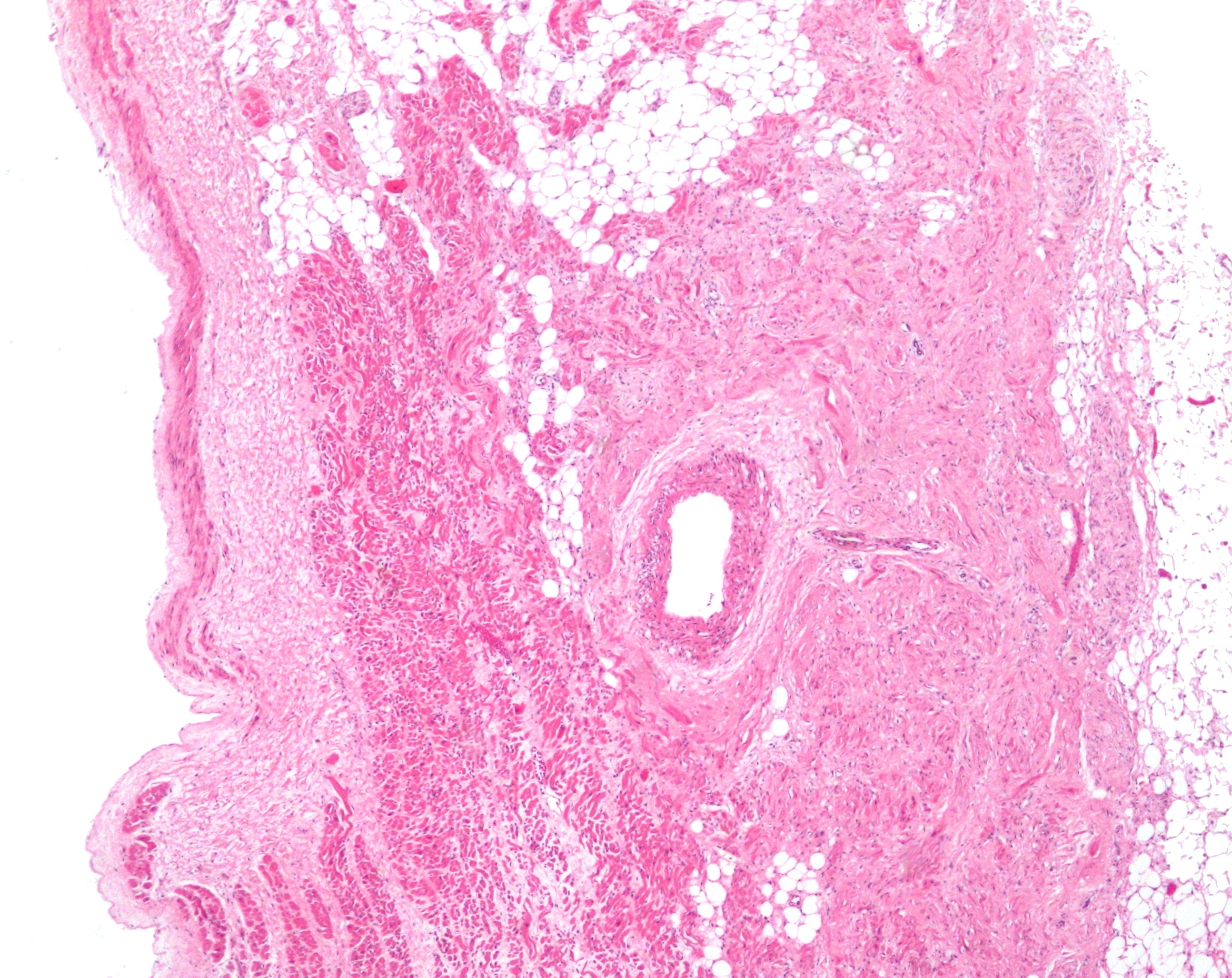
- Low magnification micrograph of a sinoatrial node (central on image), surrounding the sinuatrial nodal artery (on lumen in the image). H&E stain.

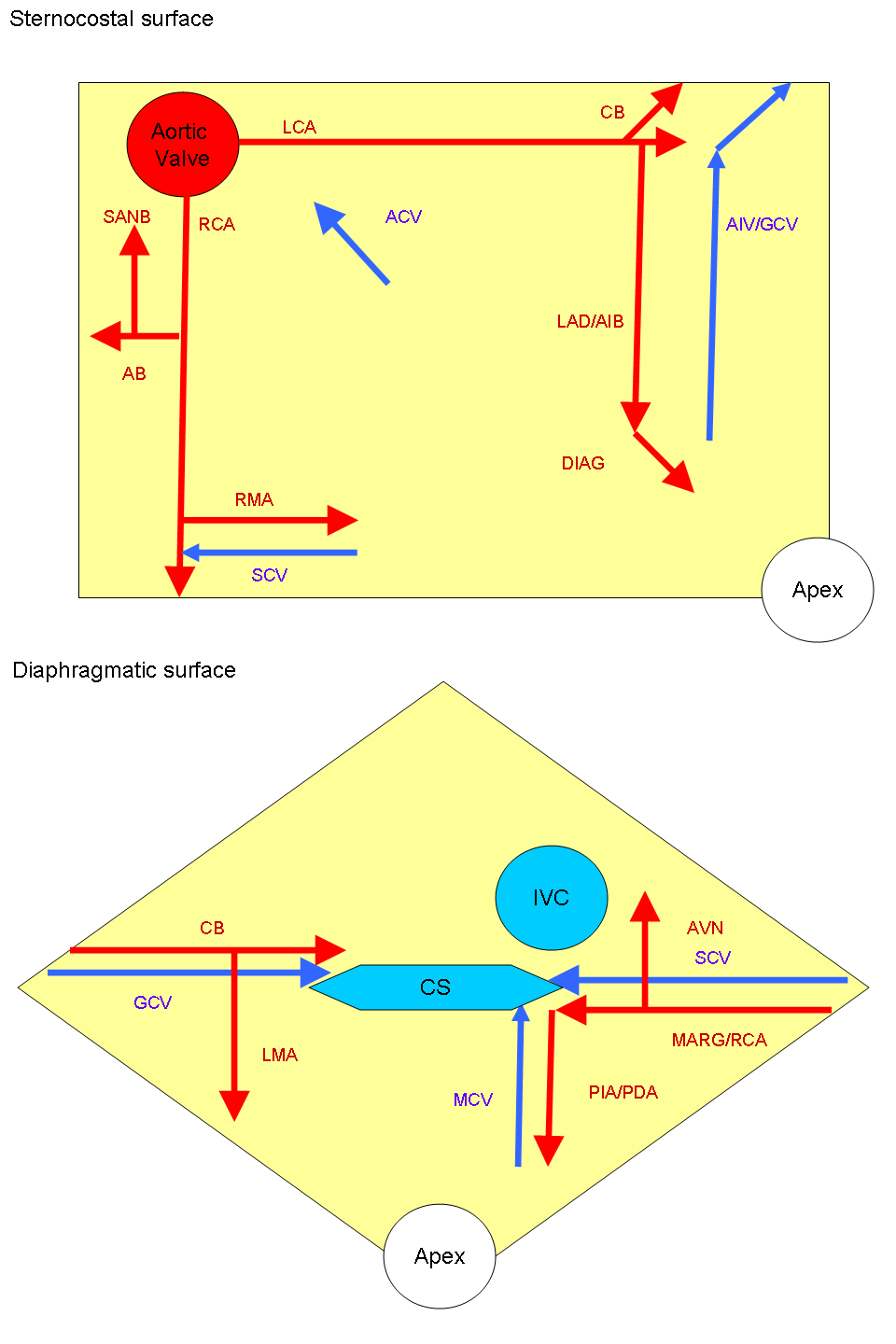
- Arteries: RCA = right coronary AB = atrial branches SANB = sinuatrial nodal RMA = right marginal LCA = left coronary CB = circumflex branch LAD/AIB = anterior interventricular LMA = left marginal PIA/PDA = posterior descending MARG = left marginal AVN = atrioventricular nodal Veins: SCV = small cardiac ACV = anterior cardiac AIV/GCV = great cardiac MCV = middle cardiac CS = coronary sinus

Details

Identifiers
- Latin: ramus nodi sinuatrialis arteriae coronariae dextrae
- TA98: A12.2.03.104
- TA2: 4133
- FMA: 3823

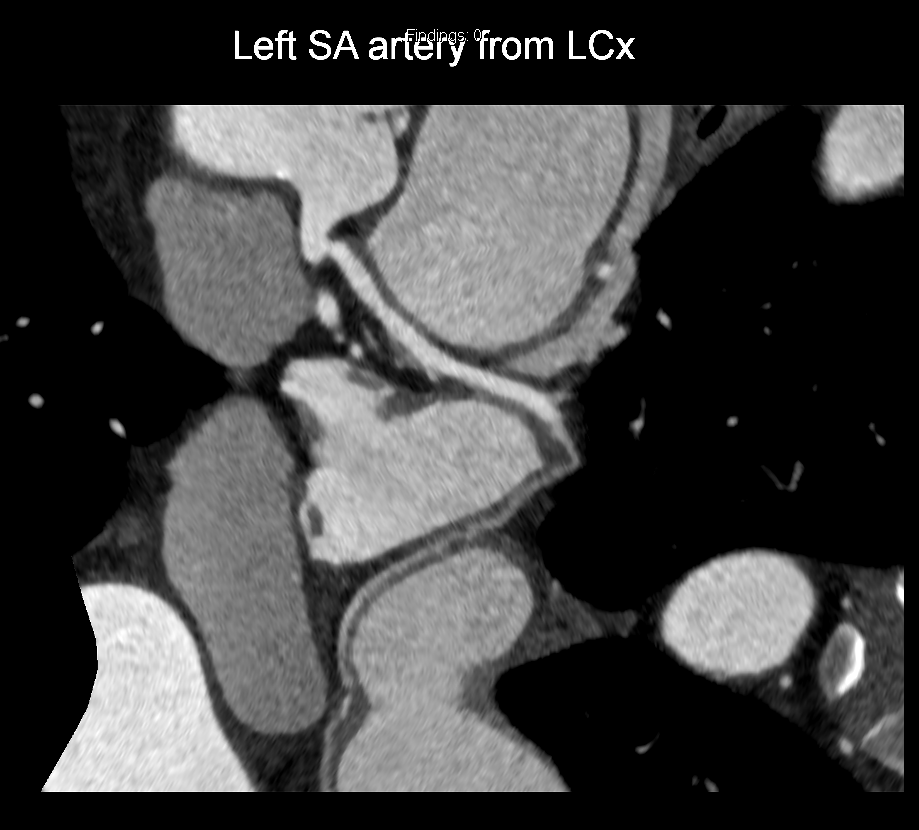
Curved planar reformatted image of sinoatrial nodal artery originating from proximal left circumflex artery. Variant anatomy.

The sinoatrial nodal artery (SANa), also known as sinoatrial artery, is an artery of the heart which supplies the sinoatrial node, the natural pacemaker center of the heart. It is usually a branch of the right coronary artery. It passes between the right atrium, and the opening of the superior vena cava.

== Anatomy ==
=== Origin ===
It arises from the right coronary artery in around 60% of individuals, from the left circumflex coronary artery in about 40% of individuals, and in less than 1% of humans, the artery has an anomalous origin directly from the coronary sinus, descending aorta, or distal right coronary artery.

The origin of the sinoatrial node artery is not related to coronary artery dominance, which means the side (right or left) that provides the circulation to the back of the heart. In contrast, the atrioventricular nodal branch, that is the artery that brings blood to the atrioventricular node, depends on coronary artery dominance.

=== Course ===
In more than 50% of human hearts, the artery actually courses close to the superior posterior aspect of the interatrial septum.

The sinoatrial node surrounds the sinoatrial artery, which can run centrally (in 70% of individuals) or off-center within the node.

=== Variation ===
A left S-shaped sinoatrial artery, originating from the proximal left circumflex or LCx artery, has been described as a common variant in approximately 10% of human hearts. This artery is larger than normal and supplies a good part of the left atrium, but also right-sided structures like part of the sinoatrial node and the atrioventricular nodal areas. In this variant, the artery courses in the sulcus between the left superior pulmonary vein and the left atrial appendage where it could be susceptible to injury during catheter or surgical ablation procedures on the left atrium, especially for atrial fibrillation ablation or open-heart cardiac surgery.

== Additional images ==
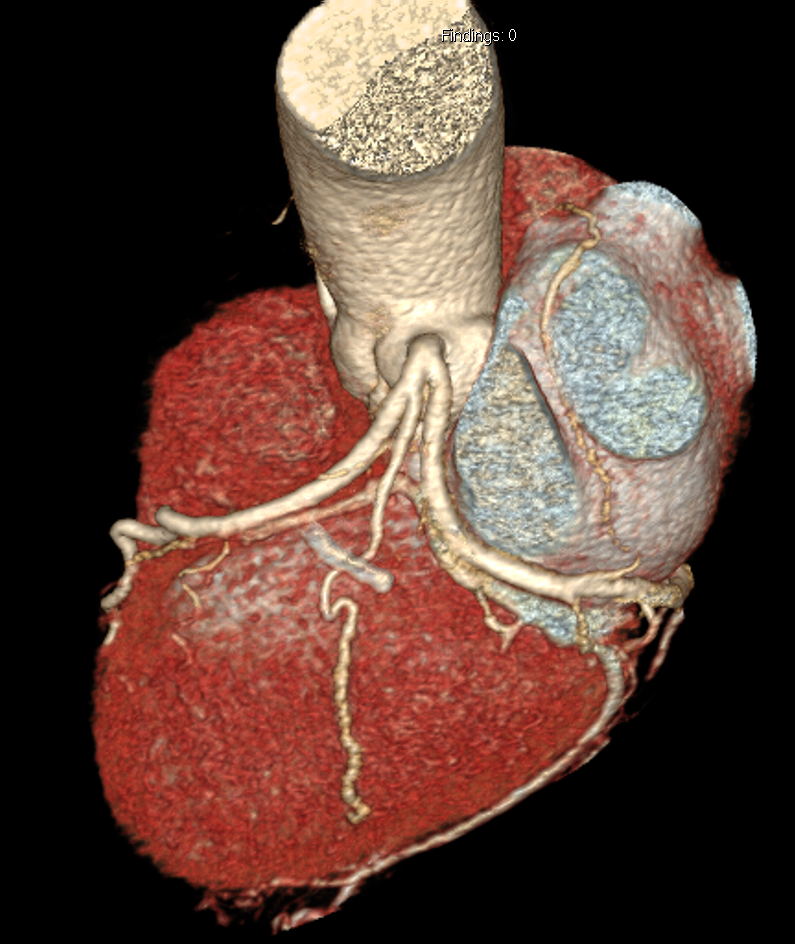
3D volume rendered CTA image showing sinoatrial nodal artery originating from the proximal circumflex artery. Variant anatomy.

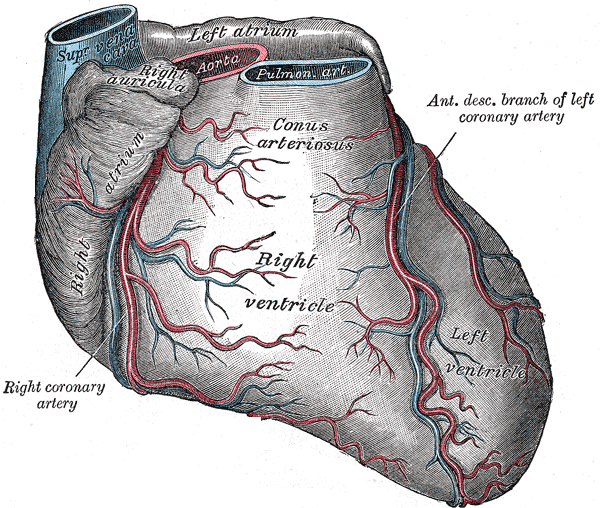
Sternocostal surface of heart (right coronary artery visible at left)
