= Small cardiac vein =

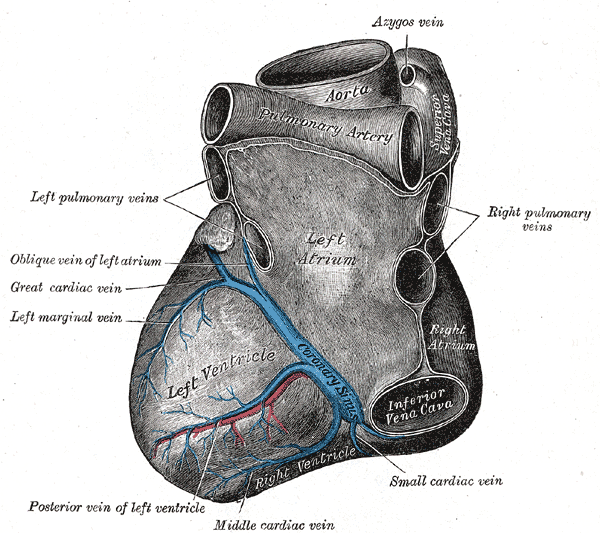
- Base and diaphragmatic surface of heart (small cardiac vein labeled at lower right.)

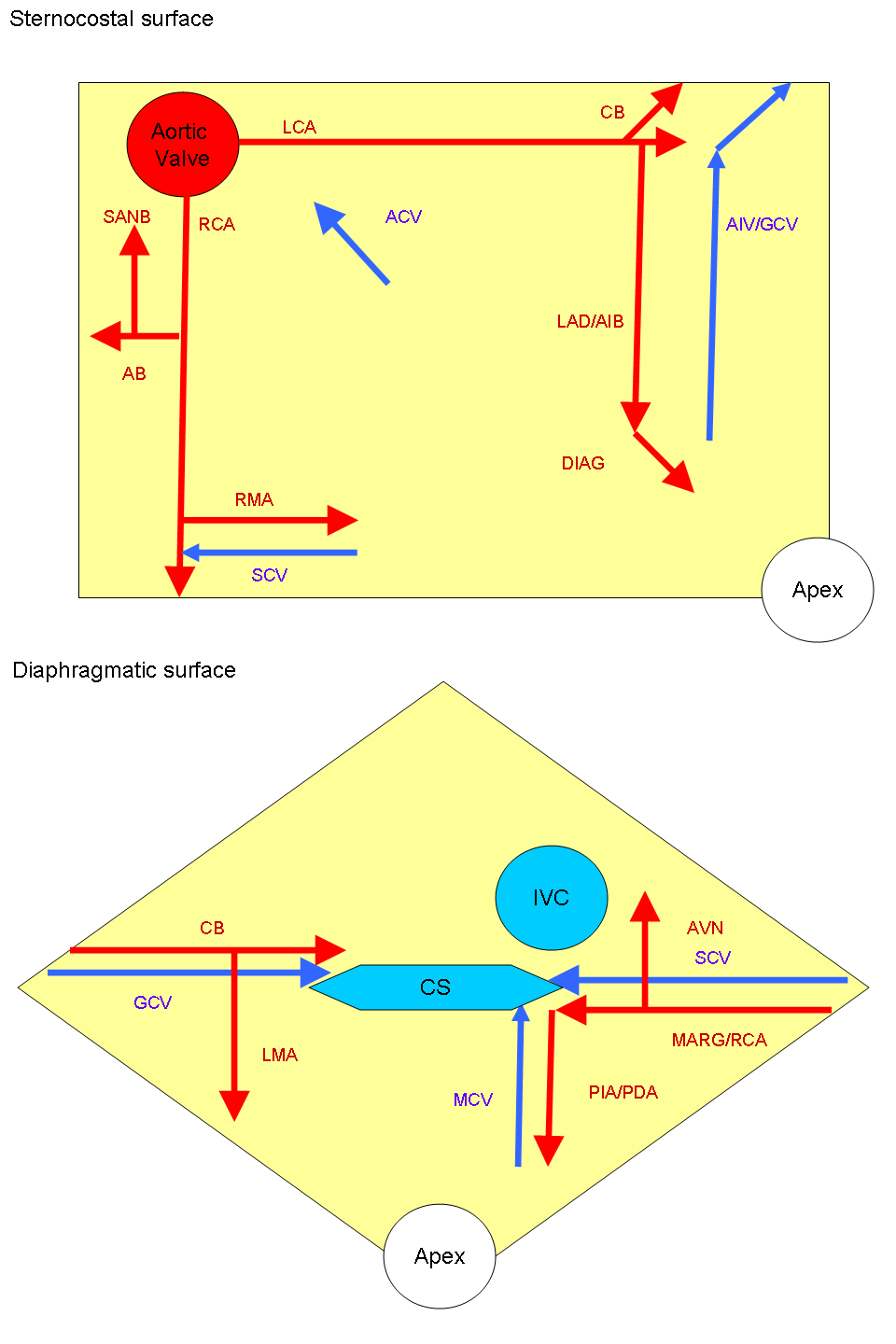
- Arteries: RCA = right coronary AB = atrial branches SANB = sinuatrial nodal RMA = right marginal LCA = left coronary CB = circumflex branch LAD/AIB = anterior interventricular LMA = left marginal PIA/PDA = posterior descending AVN = atrioventricular nodal Veins: SCV = small cardiac ACV = anterior cardiac AIV/GCV = great cardiac MCV = middle cardiac CS = coronary sinus

Details
- Drains to: Coronary sinus

Identifiers
- Latin: venae cardiacae minimae, vena cordis parva
- TA98: A12.3.01.010
- TA2: 4166
- FMA: 4714

The small cardiac vein, also known as the right coronary vein, is a coronary vein that drains parts of the right atrium and right ventricle of the heart. Despite its size, it is one of the major drainage vessels for the heart.

== Anatomy ==
=== Course ===
The small cardiac vein runs in the coronary sulcus between the right atrium and right ventricle, and opens into the right extremity of the coronary sinus.

=== Territory ===
The small cardiac vein receives blood from the posterior portion of the right atrium and ventricle.

=== Variation ===
The small cardiac vein may empty into the coronary sinus, right atrium, or middle cardiac vein. It may be absent.
