= Middle cardiac vein =

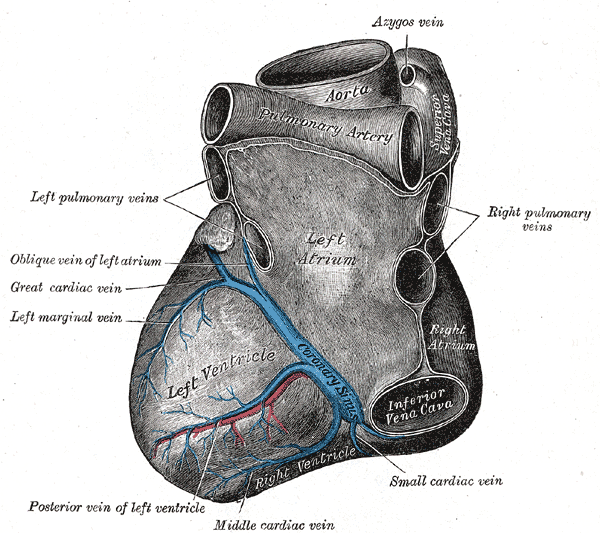
- Base and diaphragmatic surface of heart. (Middle cardiac vein labeled at bottom.)

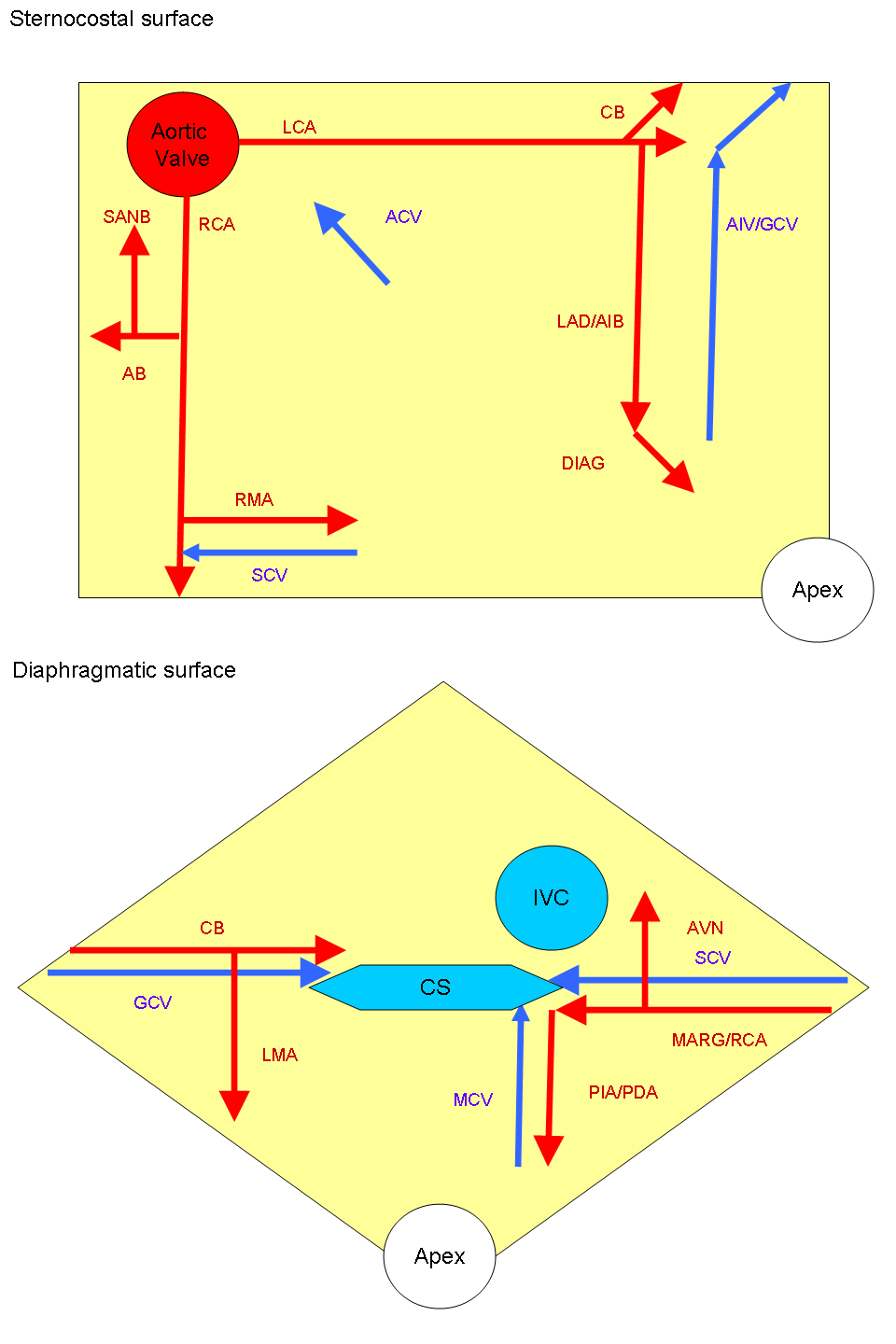
- ARTERIES: RCA = right coronary AB = atrial branches SANB = sinuatrial nodal RMA = right marginal LCA = left coronary CB = circumflex branch LAD/AIB = anterior interventricular LMA = left marginal PIA/PDA = posterior descending AVN = atrioventricular nodal VEINS: SCV = small cardiac ACV = anterior cardiac AIV/GCV = great cardiac MCV = middle cardiac CS = coronary sinus

Details
- Drains to: Coronary sinus
- Artery: Posterior interventricular artery

Identifiers
- Latin: vena cardiaca media, vena cordis media
- TA98: A12.3.01.009
- TA2: 4165
- FMA: 4713

The middle cardiac vein commences at the apex of the heart. It passes posteriorly along the inferior interventricular sulcus to end at the coronary sinus near the sinus' termination.

== Structure ==
=== Origin ===
The middle cardiac vein commences at the cardiac apex (here, it is contiguous with the great cardiac vein, thus forming - along with the coronary sinus - a complete venous circle).

=== Variation ===
The middle cardiac vein has a constant location on the surface of the ventricles.

== Clinical significance ==
The middle cardiac vein is useful for epicardial access to the inferior side of the ventricles.
