= Posterior descending artery =

Artery supplying the heart

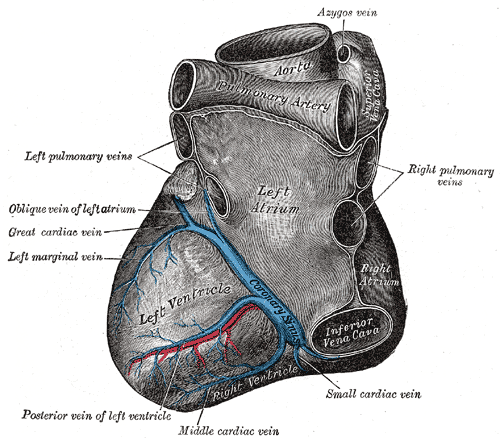
- Base and diaphragmatic surface of heart. (Posterior descending artery not visible, but it runs near the middle cardiac vein, which is labeled at the bottom.)

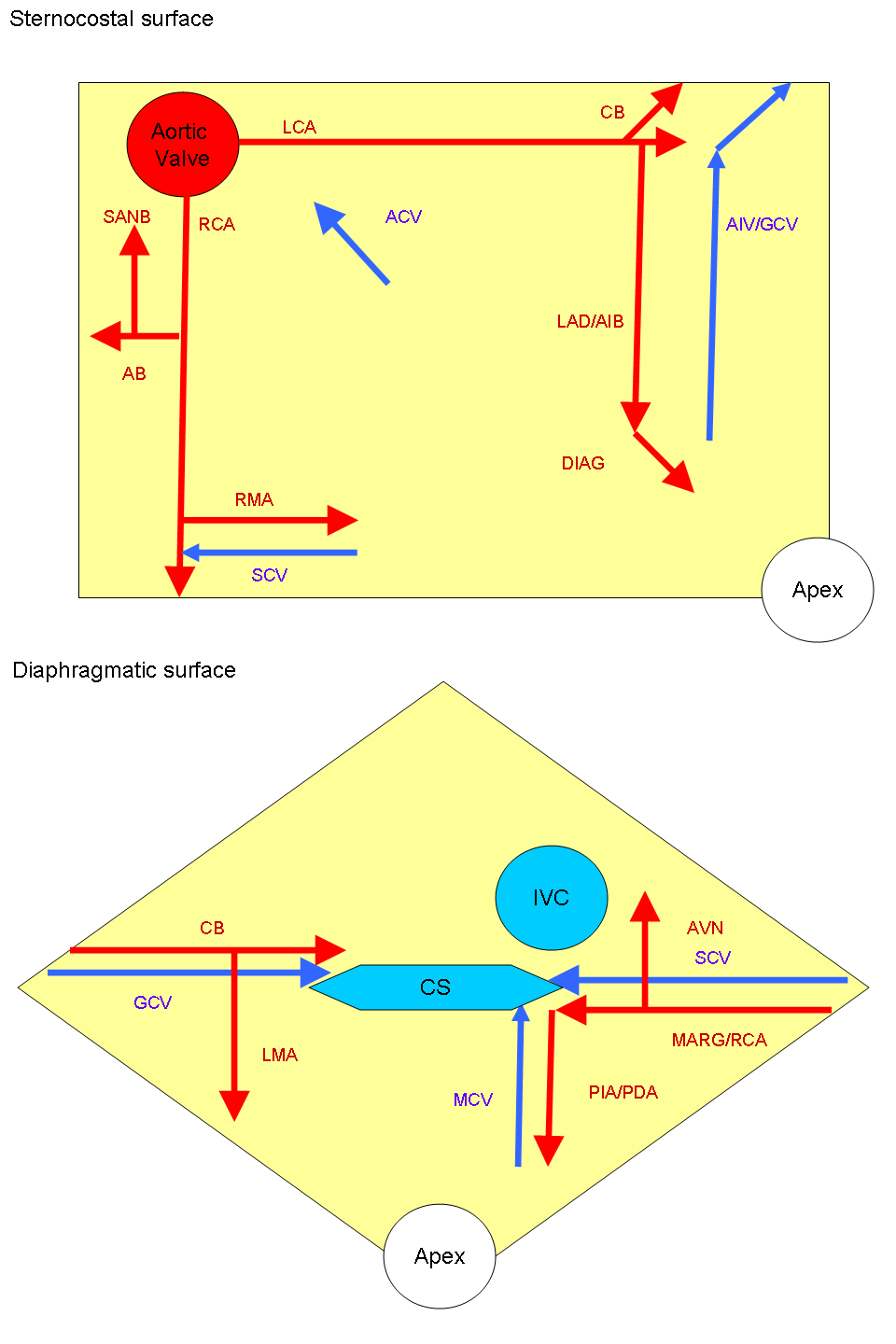
- ARTERIES: RCA = right coronary AB = atrial branches SANB = sinuatrial nodal RMA = right marginal LCA = left coronary CB = circumflex branch LAD/AIB = anterior interventricular LMA = left marginal PIA/PDA = posterior descending AVN = atrioventricular nodal VEINS: SCV = small cardiac ACV = anterior cardiac AIV/GCV = great cardiac MCV = middle cardiac CS = coronary sinus

Details
- Source: Right coronary artery
- Vein: Middle cardiac vein, posterior interventricular vein
- Supplies: Ventricles interventricular septum

Identifiers
- Latin: ramus interventricularis posterior arteriae
- TA98: A12.2.03.108
- TA2: 4138
- FMA: 3840

In the coronary circulation, the posterior descending artery (PDA), also called the posterior interventricular artery (PIV, PIA, or PIVA), is an artery running in the posterior interventricular sulcus to the apex of the heart where it meets with the left anterior descending artery also known as the anterior interventricular artery. The PDA supplies the posterior third of the interventricular septum. The remaining anterior two-thirds is supplied by the left anterior descending artery, which is a branch of left coronary artery.

It is typically a branch of the right coronary artery (70%, known as right dominance). Alternately, the PDA can be a branch of the circumflex coronary artery (10%, known as left dominance) which itself is a branch of the left coronary artery. It can also be supplied by an anastomosis of the left and right coronary artery (20%, known as co-dominance).

Variants have been reported.

The anatomical position of the artery is not really posterior, but inferior. The terminology posterior is based on viewing the heart from the "Valentine" position, not by the heart's actual position in the body.

== Additional images ==
Coronary arteries (labeled in red text) and other major landmarks (in blue text). Posterior descending artery is labeled at left.

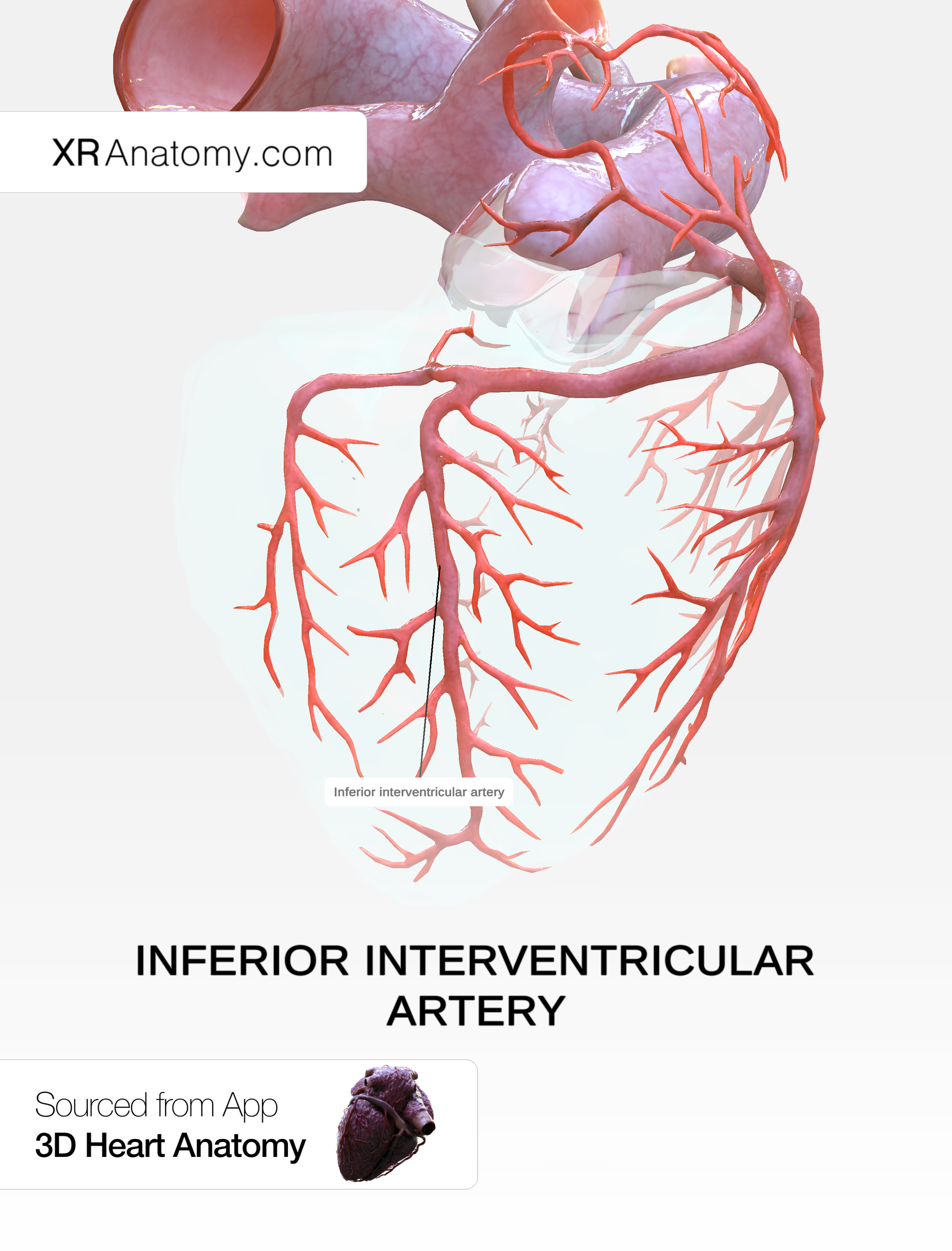

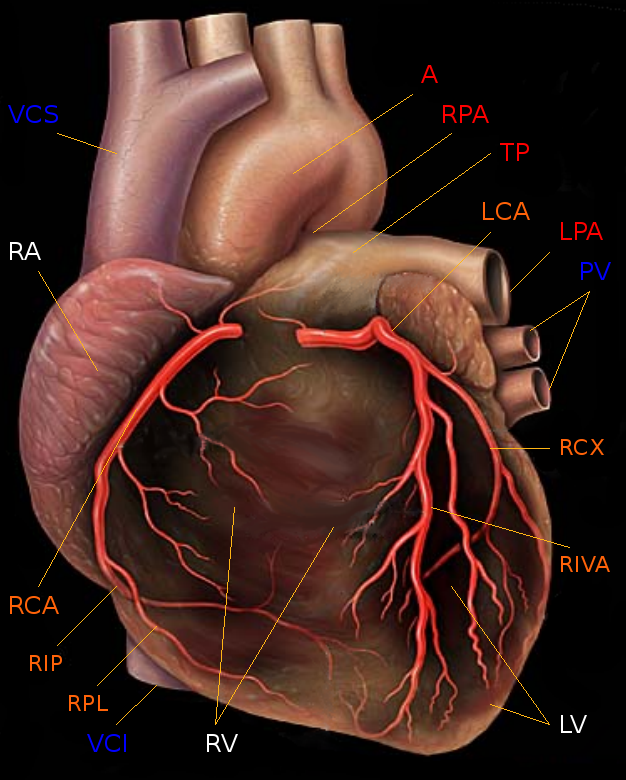
Human heart with coronary arteries
