= Interventricular artery =

Interventricular artery may refer to:

- Anterior interventricular branch of left coronary artery
- Posterior interventricular artery
