= Crux cordis =

Part of the cardiovascular system

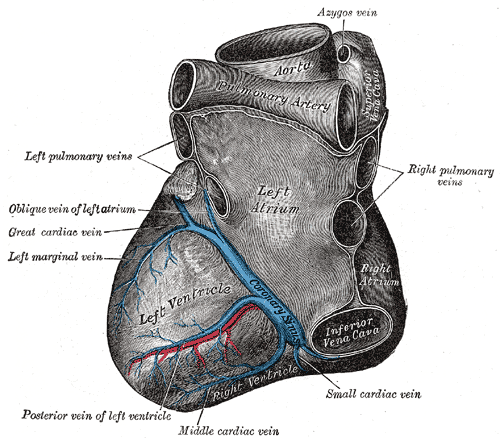
Back side and base of the heart. The coronary sinus (labeled) runs in the coronary sulcus; the middle cardiac vein (labeled) runs in the posterior interventricular sulcus. The two sulci meet in the crux cordis.

The crux cordis or crux of the heart (from Latin "crux" meaning "cross") is the area on the lower back side of the heart where the coronary sulcus (the groove separating the atria from the ventricles) and the posterior interventricular sulcus (the groove separating the left from the right ventricle) meet. It is important surgically because the atrioventricular nodal artery, a small but vital vessel, passes in proximity to the crux of the heart. It is the anastomotic point of right and left coronary artery.
