= Left marginal vein =

Vein of the torso

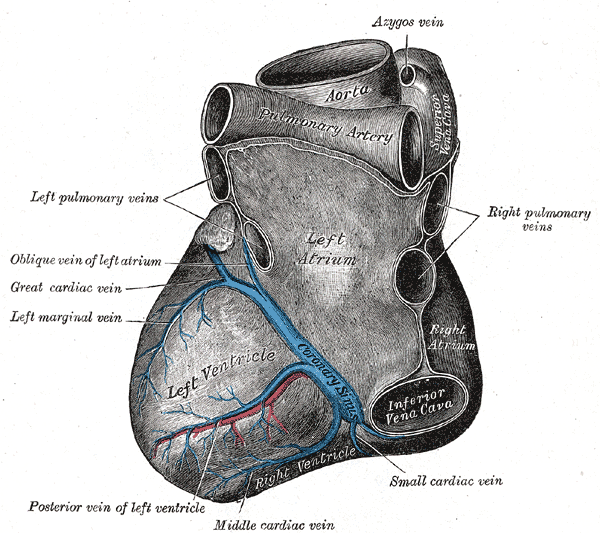
- Base and diaphragmatic surface of heart. (Left marginal vein labeled at center left.)

Details
- Drains from: Left ventricle
- Drains to: Great cardiac vein
- Artery: Left marginal artery

Identifiers
- Latin: vena marginalis sinistra
- TA98: A12.3.01.005
- TA2: 4161
- FMA: 4708

The left marginal vein is a vein of the heart which courses near or over the left margin of the heart. It drains venous blood from much of the myocardium of the left ventricle. It usually empties into the great cardiac vein (but may sometimes instead drain into the coronary sinus directly).

Along its course, it is accompanied by a marginal branch of the left coronary artery (the arterial branch running deep to the left marginal vein).
