= Left border of heart =

Part of left heart ventricle

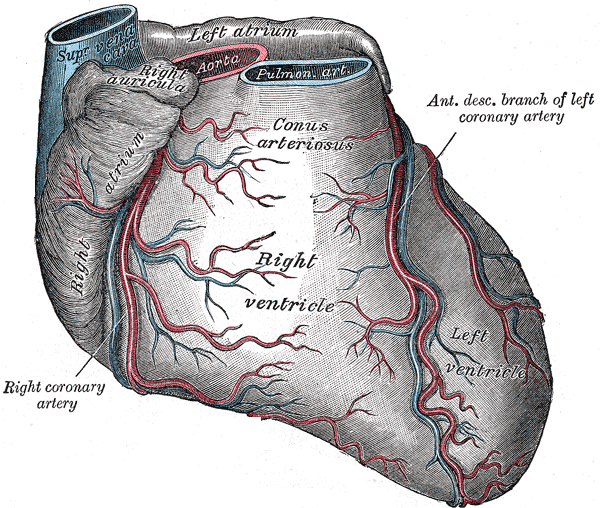
- Sternocostal surface of heart.

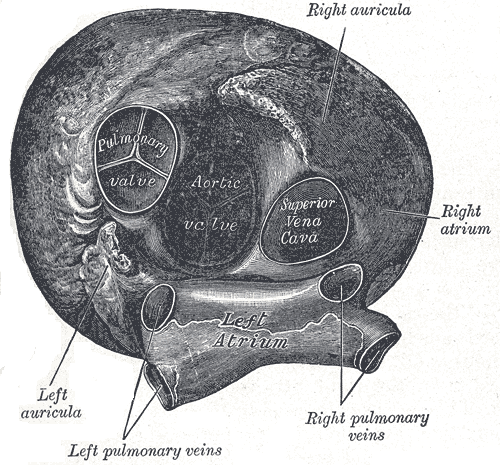
- Heart seen from above.

Details

Identifiers
- Latin: margo obtusus

The left border of heart (or obtuse margin) is formed from the rounded lateral wall of the left ventricle. It is called the 'obtuse' margin because of the obtuse angle (>90 degrees) created between the anterior part of the heart and the left side, which is formed from the rounded lateral wall of the left ventricle. Within this margin can be found the obtuse marginal artery, which is the a branch of the left circumflex artery.

It extends from a point in the second left intercostal space, about 2.5 mm. from the sternal margin, obliquely downward, with a convexity to the left, to the apex of the heart.

This is contrasted with the acute margin of the heart, which is at the border of the anterior and posterior surface, and in which the acute marginal branch of the right coronary artery is found. The angle formed here is <90 degrees, therefore an acute angle.
