= Posterior vein of the left ventricle =

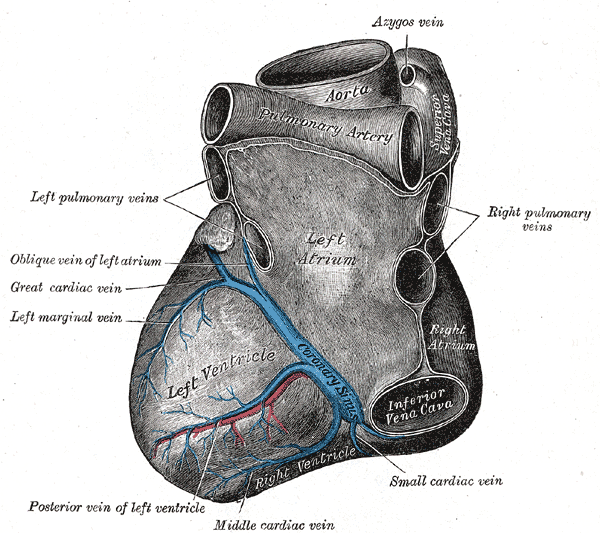
- Base and diaphragmatic surface of heart. (Posterior vein of the left ventricle labeled at lower left.)

Details

Identifiers
- Latin: vena ventriculi sinistri posterior
- TA98: A12.3.01.006
- TA2: 4162
- FMA: 4712

The posterior vein of the left ventricle runs on the diaphragmatic surface of the left ventricle to the coronary sinus, but may end in the great cardiac vein.
