= Right marginal vein =

Human blood vessel

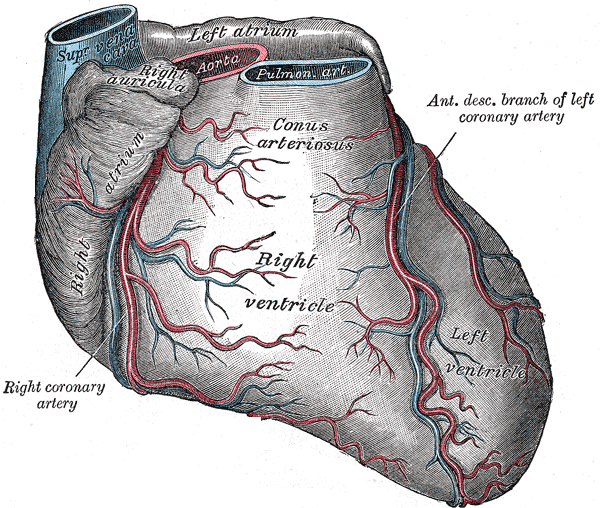
- Sternocostal surface of heart (right marginal vein not labeled, but is visible at bottom left)

Details
- Drains to: Right atrium
- Artery: Right marginal artery

Identifiers
- Latin: vena marginalis dextra
- TA98: A12.3.01.011
- TA2: 4167
- FMA: 4716

The right marginal vein is a vein of the heart running along the inferior margin of the heart. It drains adjacent region of the right ventricle. It usually opens directly into the right atrium, but may sometimes instead empty into the anterior cardiac veins, or (less commonly) the coronary sinus.

The right marginal vein often considered as one of the anterior cardiac veins.
