= Vieussens valve of the coronary sinus =

The Vieussens valve of the coronary sinus is a prominent valve at the end of the great cardiac vein, marking the commencement of the coronary sinus. It is often a flimsy valve composed of one to three leaflets. It is present in 80-90% of individuals. It serves as an anatomical landmark. It is clinically important because it is often an obstruction to catheters in 20% of patients.
