= Circumflex branch of left coronary artery =

Artery of the heart

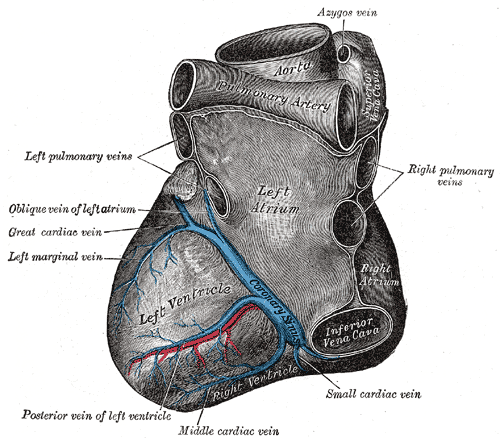
- Base and diaphragmatic surface of heart. (Circumflex branch not visible, but would be near the coronary sinus.)

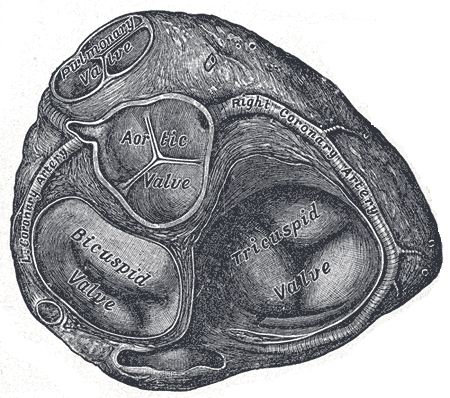
- Base of ventricles exposed by removal of the atria. (Circumflex branch not visible, but bifurcation of left coronary artery visible at left.)

Details
- Source: Left coronary artery
- Branches: Left atrial branch left marginal artery posterolateral artery sinuatrial nodal artery (in some people) posterior interventricular artery (in some people)
- Supplies: Posterolateral left ventricle, anterolateral papillary muscle, the sinoatrial nodal artery in 38% of people.

Identifiers
- Latin: ramus circumflexus arteriae coronariae sinistrae
- TA98: A12.2.03.206
- TA2: 4148
- FMA: 3895

The circumflex branch of left coronary artery (also known as the left circumflex artery (LCX) or circumflex artery) is a branch of the left coronary artery. It winds around the left side of the heart along the atrioventricular groove (coronary sulcus). It supplies the posterolateral portion of the left ventricle.

In a minority of individuals, the left circumflex artery gives rise to the posterior interventricular artery, in which cases such a heart is deemed left dominant.

== Anatomy ==
The left circumflex artery follows the left part of the coronary sulcus, running first to the left and then to the right, reaching nearly as far as the posterior longitudinal sulcus. There have been multiple anomalies described, for example the left circumflex having an aberrant course from the right coronary artery.

=== Branches ===
The circumflex artery curves to the left around the heart within the coronary sulcus, giving rise to one or more left marginal arteries (also called obtuse marginal branches) as it curves toward the posterior surface of the heart. It helps form the posterior left ventricular branch or posterolateral artery. The circumflex artery ends at the point where it joins to form to the posterior interventricular artery in 15% of all cases, which lies in the posterior interventricular sulcus. In the other 85% of all cases the posterior interventricular artery comes out of the right coronary artery. When the left circumflex supplies the posterior descending artery in those 15% of cases, it is known as a left dominant circulation.

=== Distribution ===
The circumflex artery supplies the posterolateral left ventricle and the anterolateral papillary muscle.

It also supplies the sinoatrial nodal artery in 38% of people.

It supplies 15–25% of the left ventricle in right-dominant systems. If the coronary anatomy is left-dominant, the circumflex artery supplies 40–50% of the left ventricle.

== Additional images ==
Coronary arteries (labeled in red text) and other major landmarks (in blue text). Left circumflex artery is labeled at right.

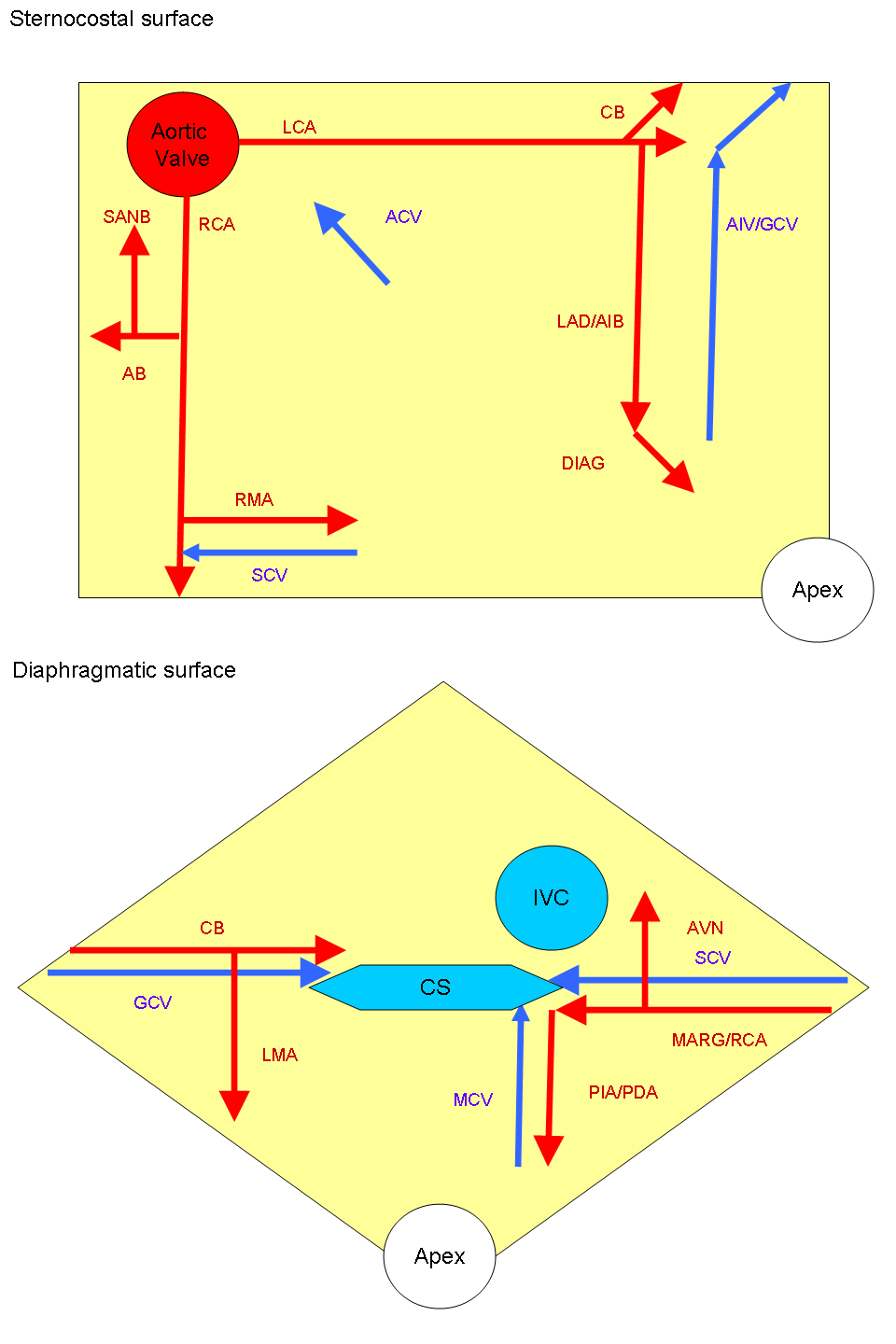
Cardiac vessel schematic

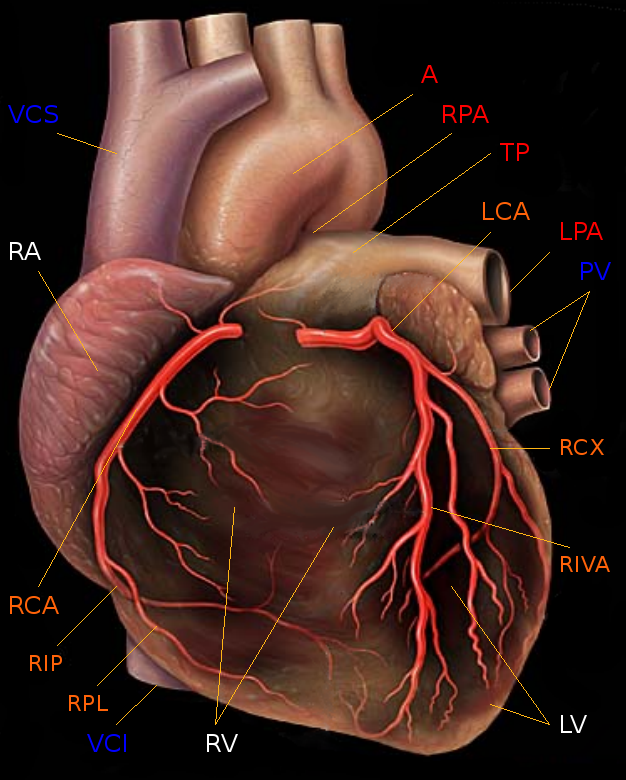
Human heart with coronary arteries

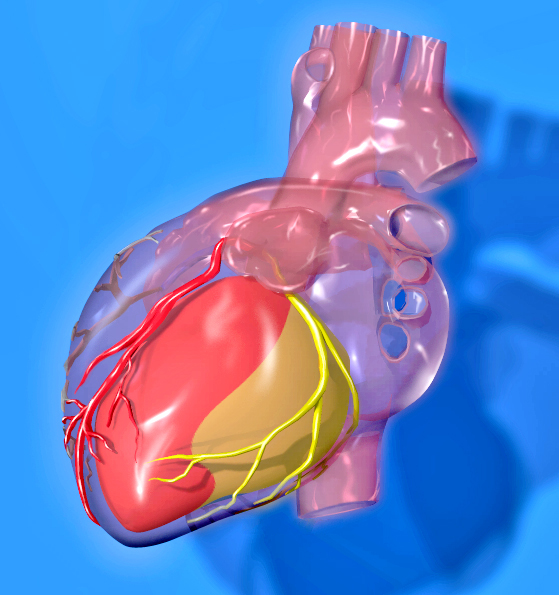
Heart coronary territories

Heart left lateral coronaries diagram
