= Right coronary artery =

Blood vessel supplying the human heart

- Blood supply of the heart, with the right coronary artery labelled.

Details
- Location: Heart
- Supplies: Right atrium, right ventricle, 25-35% of left ventricle

Identifiers
- Latin: arteria coronaria dextra
- Acronym: RCA
- TA98: A12.2.03.101
- TA2: 4131
- FMA: 50039

In the blood supply of the heart, the right coronary artery (RCA) is an artery originating above the right cusp of the aortic valve, at the right aortic sinus in the heart. It travels down the right coronary sulcus, towards the crux of the heart. It gives off many branches, including the sinoatrial nodal artery, right marginal artery, posterior interventricular artery, conus artery, and atrioventricular nodal branch. It contributes the right side of the heart, and parts of the interventricular septum.

== Structure ==
The right coronary artery originates above the right aortic sinus above the aortic valve. It passes along the right coronary sulcus (right atrioventricular groove) towards the crux of the heart.

=== Segments ===
- Proximal: starting at RCA origin, spanning half the distance to the acute margin
- Middle: from proximal segment to the acute margin
- Distal: from middle segment to origination point of the posterior interventricular artery, where the posterior interventricular sulcus meets the atrioventricular groove on the base of the heart.

=== Variation ===
In approximately 80% of patients (right dominant), the RCA gives off the posterior descending artery (PDA). In the other 20%, of cases (left dominant or codominant), the PDA arises from the left circumflex artery or is supplied by both the right coronary artery and the left circumflex. The PDA supplies the inferior wall, ventricular septum, and the posteromedial papillary muscle.

The RCA also supplies the SA nodal artery in 60% of people. The other 40% of the time, the SA nodal artery is supplied by the left circumflex artery.

Although rare, several anomalous courses of the right coronary artery have been described including origin from the left aortic sinus.

=== Distribution ===
The right coronary artery supplies oxygenated blood to the right atrium, the right ventricle, and the posterior third and inferior end of the interventricular septum. It may also supply 25% to 35% of the left ventricle (LV).

There is significant overlap of supply of the coronary arteries. The right coronary artery is dominant over the left coronary artery 50% of the time, equal to it 20% of the time, and less significant than it 30% of the time.

== Additional images ==
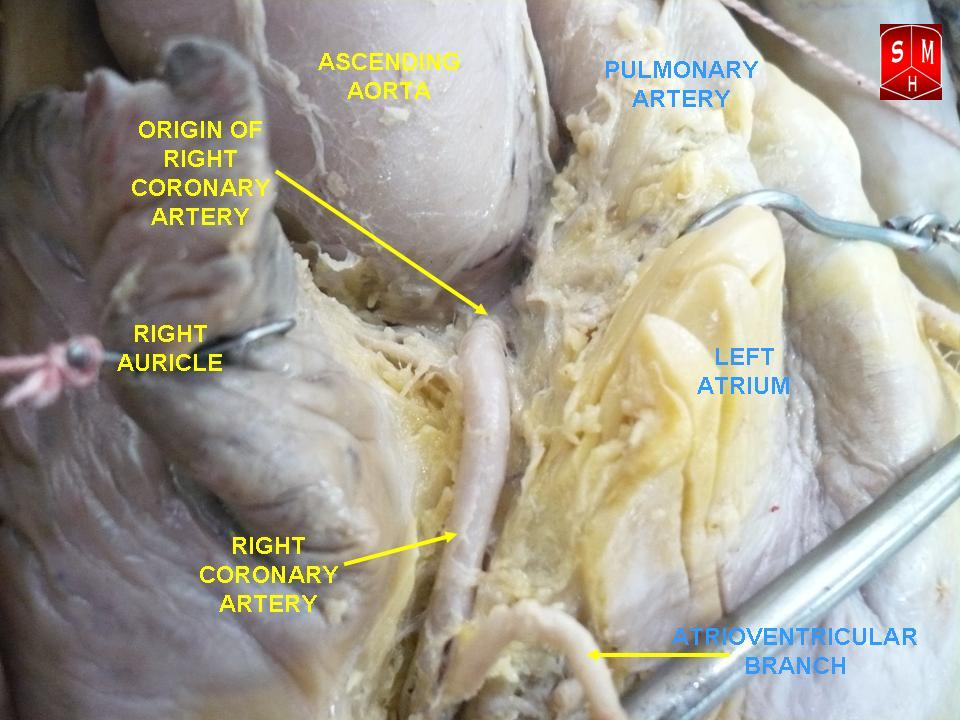
Right coronary artery

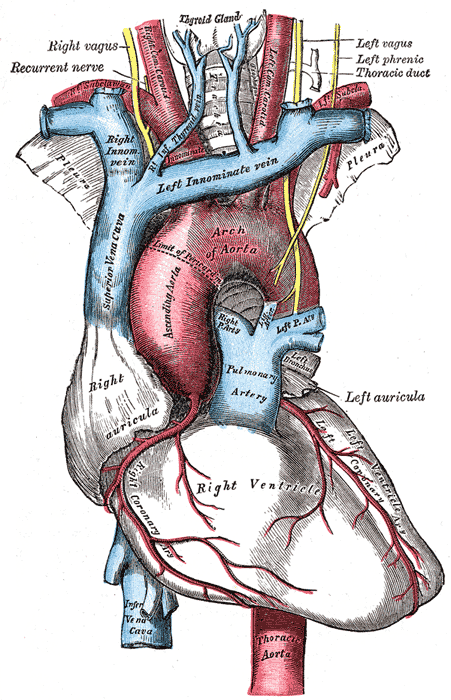
The arch of the aorta, and its branches.

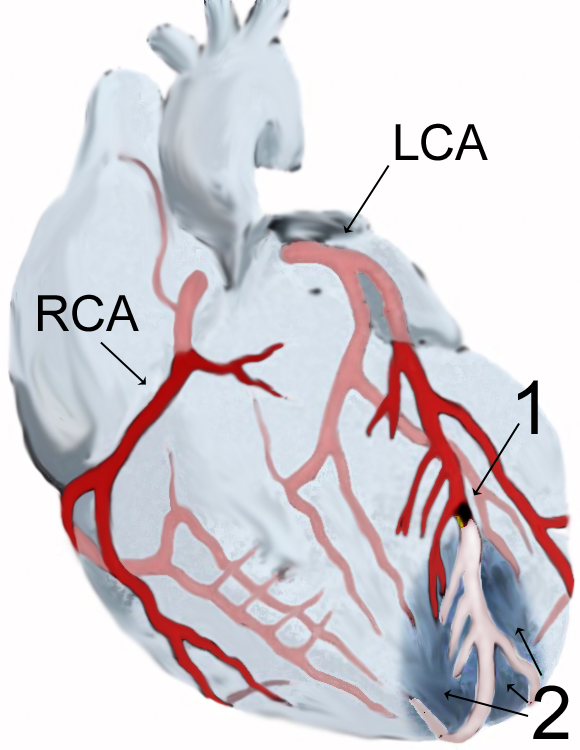
Diagram of a myocardial infarction.

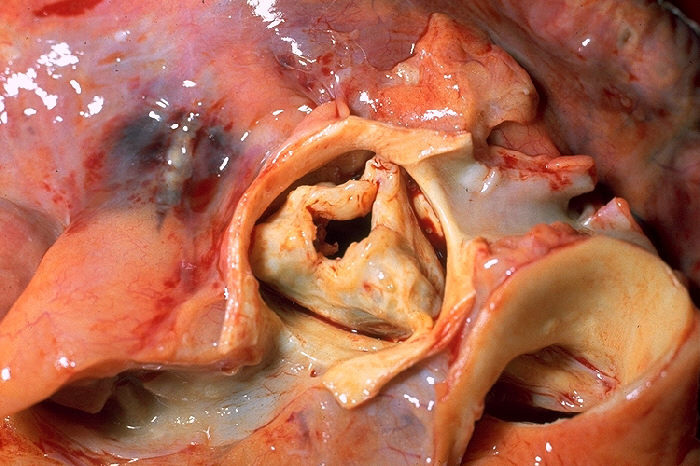
Aorta and coronary arteries at autopsy. The proximal portion of the RCA and its ostium can be seen at the lower left.

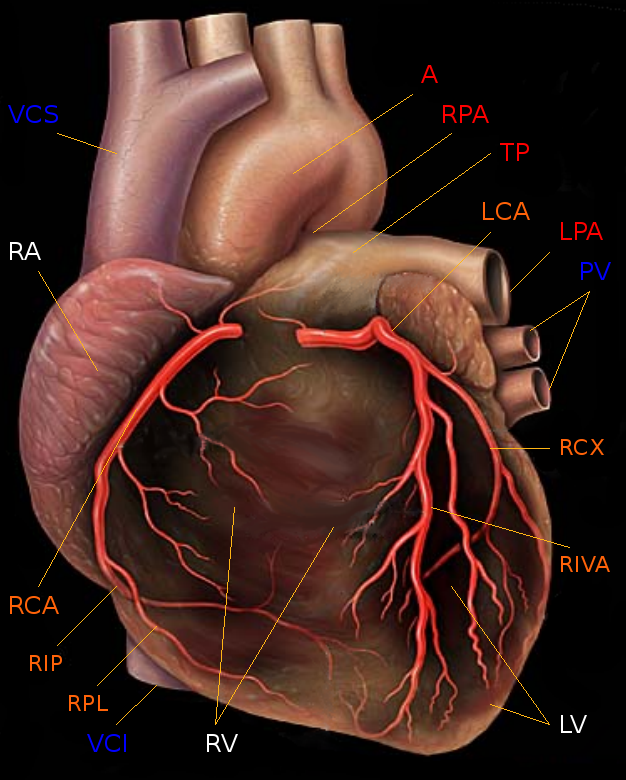
Human heart with coronary arteries

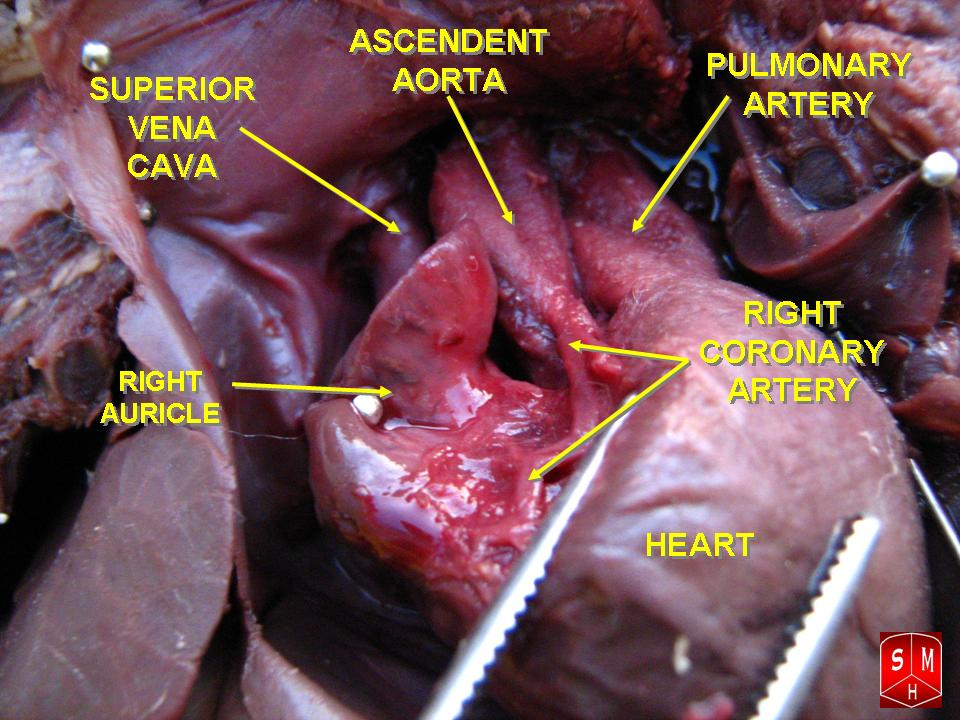
Fetal heart - right coronary artery
