= Coronary sinus =

Set of veins which drain blood from the myocardium (heart muscle)

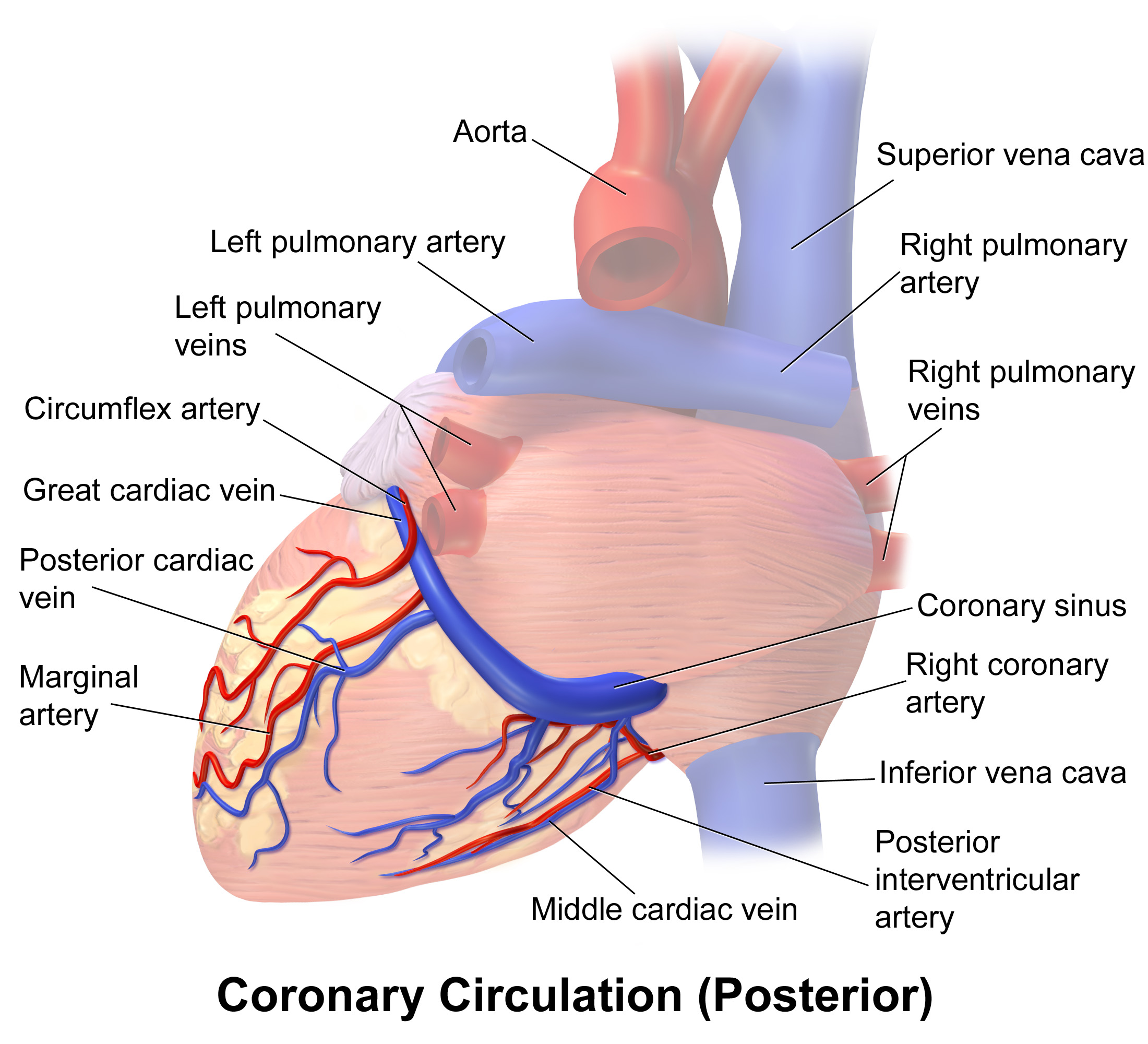
- Posterior view of coronary circulation

Details
- Precursor: Sinus venosus
- Drains from: Great, middle, small cardiac vein, posterior vein of the left ventricle, oblique vein of the left atrium
- Drains to: Right atrium

Identifiers
- Latin: sinus coronarius
- MeSH: D054326
- TA98: A12.3.01.002
- TA2: 4158
- FMA: 4706

The coronary sinus (from Latin corona 'crown') is the largest vein of the heart. It drains over half of the deoxygenated blood from the heart muscle into the right atrium. It begins on the backside of the heart, in between the left atrium, and left ventricle; it begins at the junction of the great cardiac vein, and oblique vein of the left atrium. It receives multiple tributaries. It passes across the backside of the heart along a groove between left atrium and left ventricle, then drains into the right atrium at the orifice of the coronary sinus (which is usually guarded by the valve of coronary sinus).

== Structure ==
=== Origin ===
The coronary sinus arises upon the posterior aspect of the heart between the left atrium, and left ventricle. The coronary sinus commences at the union of the great cardiac vein, and the oblique vein of the left atrium. The origin of the coronary sinus is marked by the Vieussens valve of the coronary sinus which is situated at the endpoint of the great cardiac vein.

=== Course ===
The coronary sinus runs transversely in the left atrioventricular groove (coronary sulcus) on the posterior aspect of the heart. The sinus, before entering the right atrium, is considerably dilated - nearly to the size of the end of the little finger.

=== Fate ===
The coronary sinus drains through the posterior wall of right atrium at the orifice of the coronary sinus. This orifice is located at the posteroinferior aspect of the right atrium, just medial and to the left of the orifice of inferior vena cava, and between the inferior vena cava and the right atrioventricular orifice/tricuspid valve. The orifice is usually guarded by the valve of coronary sinus (a thin, crescent-shaped valve located on the anteroinferior part of the opening into the right atrium).

=== Tributaries ===
The coronary sinus receives blood mainly from the small, middle, great, and oblique cardiac veins. It also receives blood from the left marginal vein and the left posterior ventricular vein.

- Great cardiac vein (runs upwards in the anterior interventricular sulcus to the left atrioventricular groove to form the coronary sinus;
- Middle cardiac vein (ascends posterior interventricular sulcus to drain into coronary sinus);
- Small cardiac vein (accompanies right coronary artery in the right atrioventricular groove to drain into the right side of the coronary sinus;
- Posterior vein of left ventricle (accompanies the left marginal artery, ascends the posterior wall of left ventricle to drain into the coronary sinus);
- Oblique vein of left atrium.

All veins that empty into the coronary sinus except for the oblique vein of the left atrium have valves at their junction with the coronary sinus.

The anterior cardiac veins do not drain into the coronary sinus but drain directly into the right atrium. Some small veins known as Thebesian veins drain directly into any of the four chambers of the heart.

=== Microanatomy ===
The wall of the coronary sinus is partly muscular.

== Function ==
The coronary sinus is responsible for venous return of about 55% of the cardiac blood supply.

== Clinical significance ==
Electrodes can be inserted into and through the coronary sinus to study the electrophysiology of the heart. This includes for a coronary sinus electrogram. The coronary sinus connects directly with the right atrium. It will dilate as a result of any condition that causes elevated right atrial pressure, such as pulmonary hypertension. Dilated coronary sinus is also seen in some congenital cardiovascular conditions, such as persistent left superior vena cava, and total anomalous pulmonary venous return.

In Cardiac Resynchronization Therapy (CRT) procedures, a critical step involves the insertion of a pacing lead into the coronary vein system. However, the anatomical configuration of the coronary sinus (CS) exhibits significant variability, necessitating that cardiologists assess and evaluate its characteristics during the procedure. Complications may arise when tactical decisions must be made before the endovascular implantation of the left ventricular electrode, which can be challenging due to the unique anatomical features of the CS.

== Additional images ==
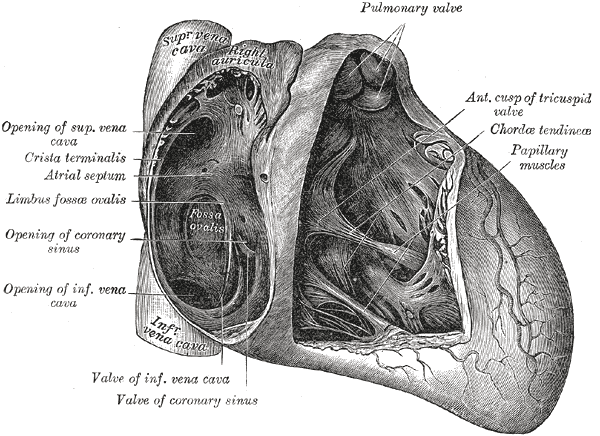
Interior of heart, viewed anteriorly (opening of coronary sinus is labeled)

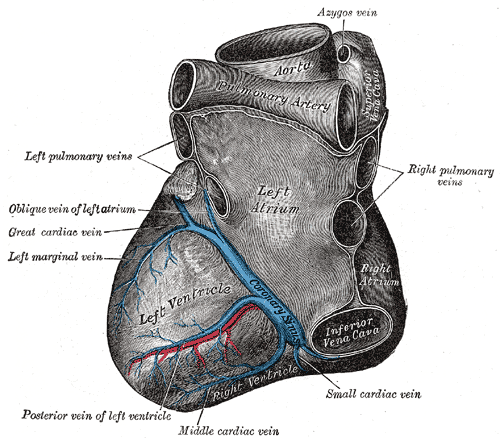
Back (posterior) side of the heart, with coronary sinus (blue) labeled

== See also ==
- Coronary arteries
- Percutaneous coronary intervention
- Cardiac skeleton
