= Left anterior descending artery =

Artery of the heart

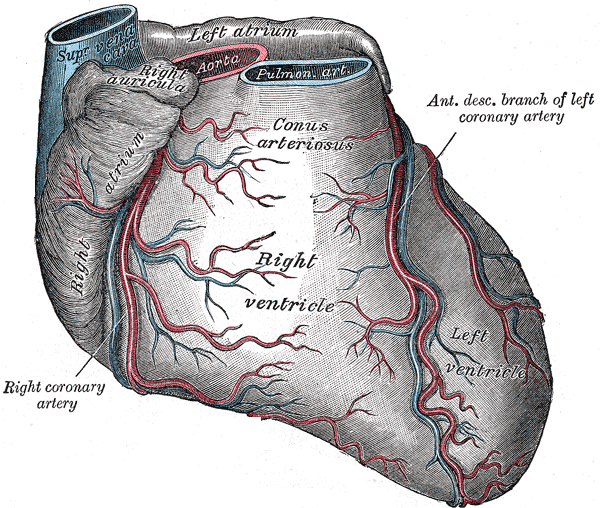
- Sternocostal surface of heart. Anterior descending branch labeled at upper right

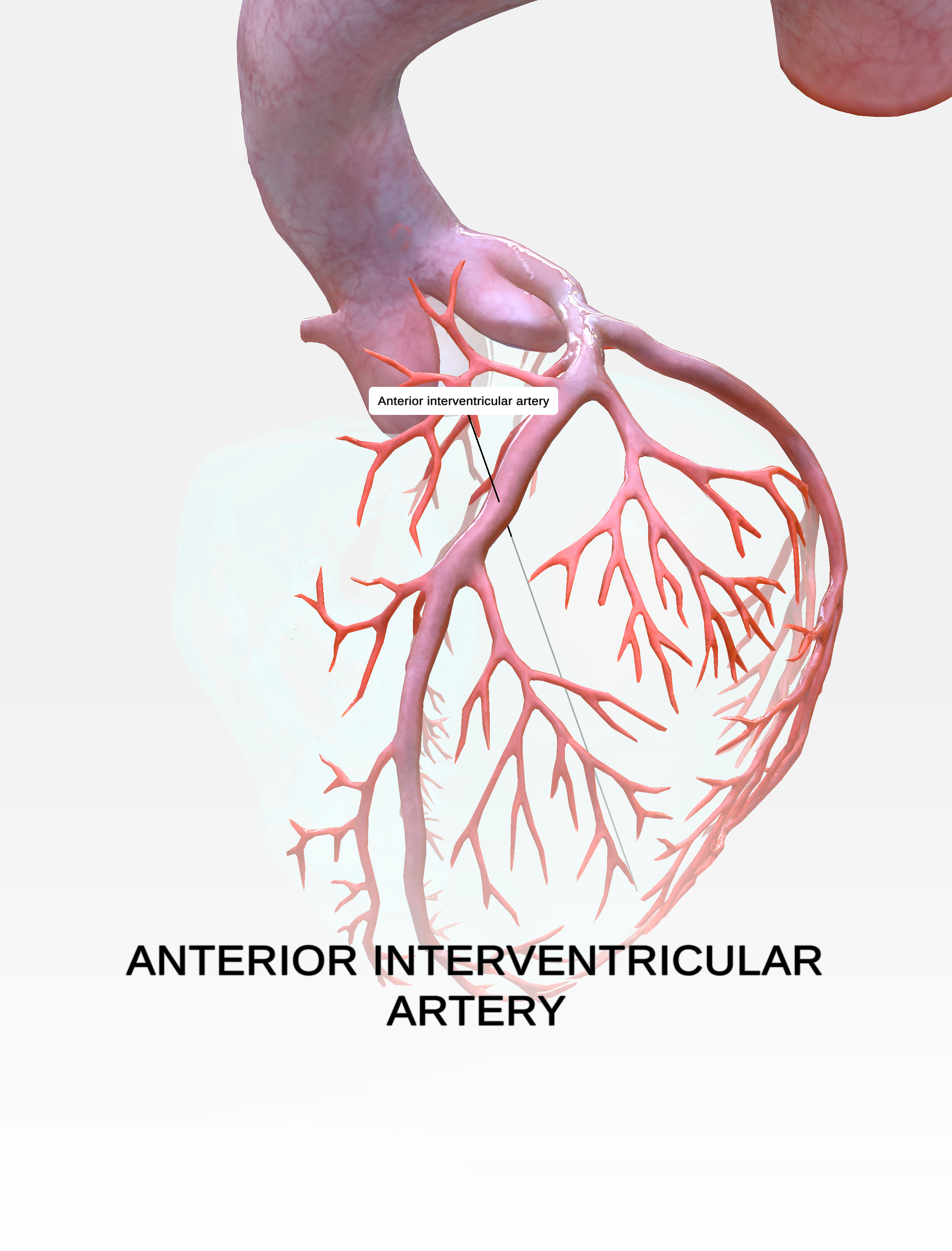

Details
- Location: Heart
- Source: Left main coronary artery
- Branches: Diagonal branches, septal perforators
- Supplies: Anterolateral myocardium, apex, interventricular septum, 45–55% of the left ventricle (LV)

Identifiers
- Latin: ramus interventricularis anterior arteriae coronariae sinistrae
- Acronym: LAD
- TA98: A12.2.03.202
- TA2: 4143
- FMA: 3862

The left anterior descending artery (LAD), also called the anterior interventricular artery (IVA, or anterior interventricular branch of the left coronary artery) is a branch of the left coronary artery. It supplies the anterior portion of the left ventricle. It provides about half of the arterial supply to the left ventricle and is thus considered the most important vessel supplying the left ventricle. Blockage of the proximal LAD is often dubbed the "widow-maker" infarction due to its poor prognosis.

== Anatomy ==
=== Course ===
The LAD arises from the left main coronary artery just beyond the pulmonary artery. It advances to the anterior interventricular sulcus, along which it descends to the notch of cardiac apex. A common variant of the LAD, the "wraparound LAD", wraps around the apex and terminates on the posterior wall.

Although rare, multiple anomalous courses of the LAD have been described. These include the origin of the artery from the right aortic sinus.

=== Branches ===
The LAD gives off two types of branches: diagonal branches and septal perforators.

- Septal perforators originate from the LAD, normal to the surface of the heart, perforating and supplying the anterior 2/3 of the interventricular septum.
- Diagonals run along the surface of the heart and supply the lateral wall of the left ventricle and the anterolateral papillary muscle.

=== Segments ===
- Proximal: from LAD origin to, and including, the origin of the first septal branch (according to some definitions, to the first diagonal, or to whichever comes first).
- Middle: from proximal segment to halfway of remaining distance to apex. A more technical definition is from the proximal segment to the point where the LAD forms an angle, as seen from a right anterior oblique view on angiography, which is often close to the origin of the second diagonal branch.
- Distal: from middle segment to apex, or in some cases beyond.

== Function ==
The artery supplies the anterior region of the left ventricle, including: the anterolateral myocardium, apex, anterior interventricular septum, and anterolateral papillary muscle. The LAD typically supplies 45–55% of the left ventricle and is therefore considered the most critical vessel in terms of myocardial blood supply.

Left: Critical stenosis (95%) of the proximal LAD in a patient with Wellens syndrome. Right: The same patient after reperfusion.

== Disease ==
Pathologies associated with the LAD include atherosclerosis, which can lead to plaque rupture, artery occlusion and subsequent myocardial infarction (MI). The "widowmaker" heart attack is an MI in which the proximal LAD becomes occluded. This type of occlusion is severe given the large territory of myocardium supplied by the LAD, especially in patients with anomalous or wraparound LADs.

LAD occlusion is best diagnosed by 12-lead electrocardiogram (ECG).
