= Great cardiac vein =

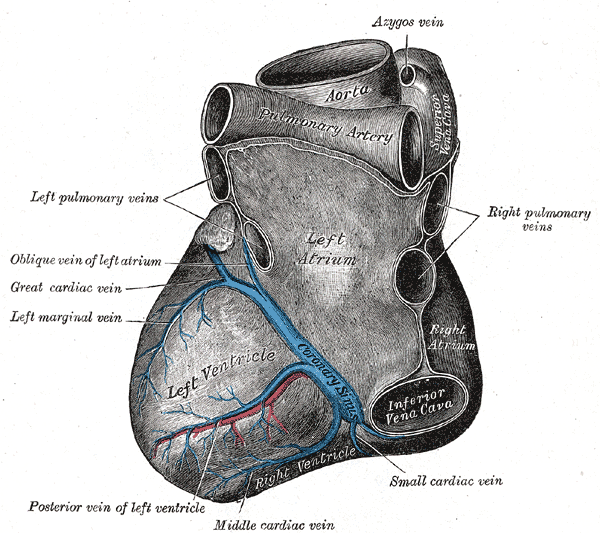
- Base and diaphragmatic surface of heart. (Great cardiac vein labeled at center left.)

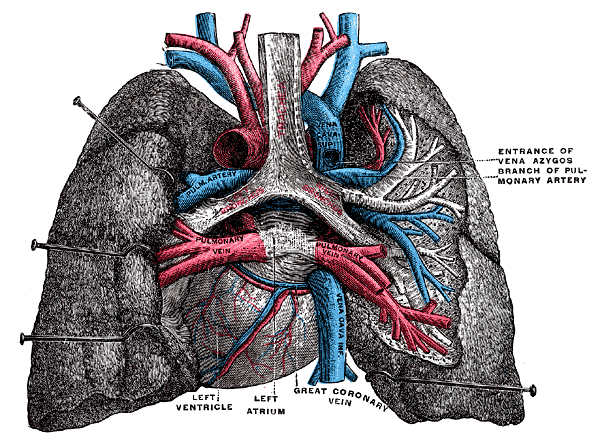
- Pulmonary vessels, seen in a dorsal view of the heart and lungs. The lungs have been pulled away from the median line, and a part of the right lung has been cut away to display the air-ducts and bloodvessels (great coronary vein labeled at center bottom).

Details
- Drains to: Coronary sinus

Identifiers
- Latin: vena cordis magna, vena cardiaca magna
- TA98: A12.3.01.003
- TA2: 4159
- FMA: 4707

The great cardiac vein (left coronary vein) is a vein of the heart. It begins at the apex of the heart and ascends along the anterior interventricular sulcus before joining the oblique vein of the left atrium to form the coronary sinus upon the posterior surface of the heart.

== Anatomy ==
=== Course ===
The great cardiac vein ascends along the anterior interventricular sulcus to the base of the ventricles. It then curves around the left margin of the heart to reach the posterior surface.

=== Fate ===
Upon reaching the posterior surface of the heart, the great cardiac vein merges with the oblique vein of the left atrium to form the coronary sinus. At the junction of the great cardiac vein and the coronary sinus, there is typically a valve present. This is the Vieussens valve of the coronary sinus.

=== Tributaries ===
The great cardiac vein receives tributaries from the left atrium and from both ventricles: one, the left marginal vein, is of considerable size, and ascends along the left margin of the heart.
