= Left coronary artery =

Artery supplying blood to the left side of the heart muscle

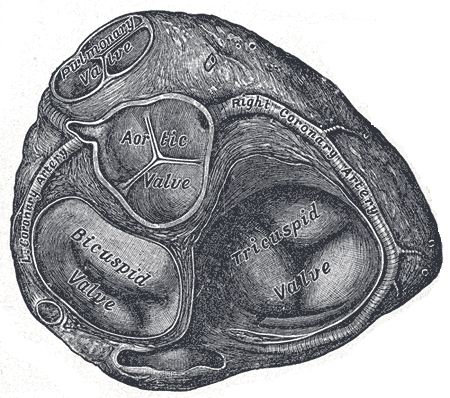
- Heart viewed from above, atria removed, base of ventricles exposed. Left coronary artery visible at left.

- Heart viewed from the front. Coronary arteries (labeled in red text) and other major landmarks (in blue text). Left coronary artery is at upper right in the image.

Details
- Source: Ascending aorta
- Branches: Anterior interventricular; circumflex (ramus intermedius)

Identifiers
- Latin: arteria coronaria sinistra
- TA98: A12.2.03.201
- TA2: 4142
- FMA: 50040

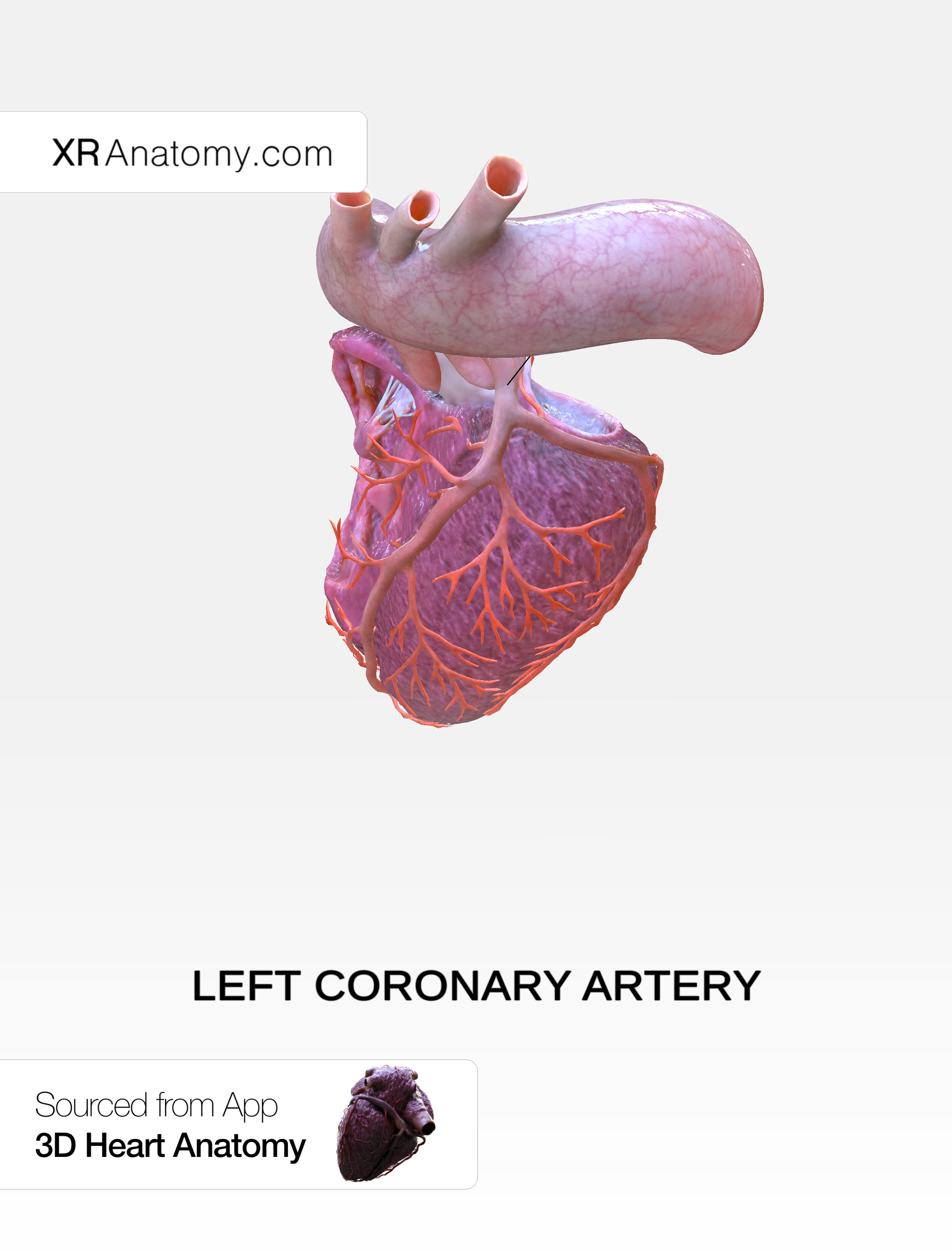

The left coronary artery (LCA, also known as the left main coronary artery, or left main stem coronary artery) is a coronary artery that arises from the aorta above the left cusp of the aortic valve, and supplies blood to the left side of the heart muscle. The left coronary artery typically runs for 10–25 mm, then bifurcates into the left anterior descending artery, and the left circumflex artery.

The part that is between the aorta and the bifurcation only is known as the left main artery (LM), while the term "LCA" might refer to just the left main, or to the left main and all its eventual branches.

== Structure ==
=== Variation ===
Sometimes, an additional artery arises at the bifurcation of the left main artery, forming a trifurcation; this extra artery is called the ramus or intermediate artery.

A "first septal branch" is sometimes described.

== Additional images ==
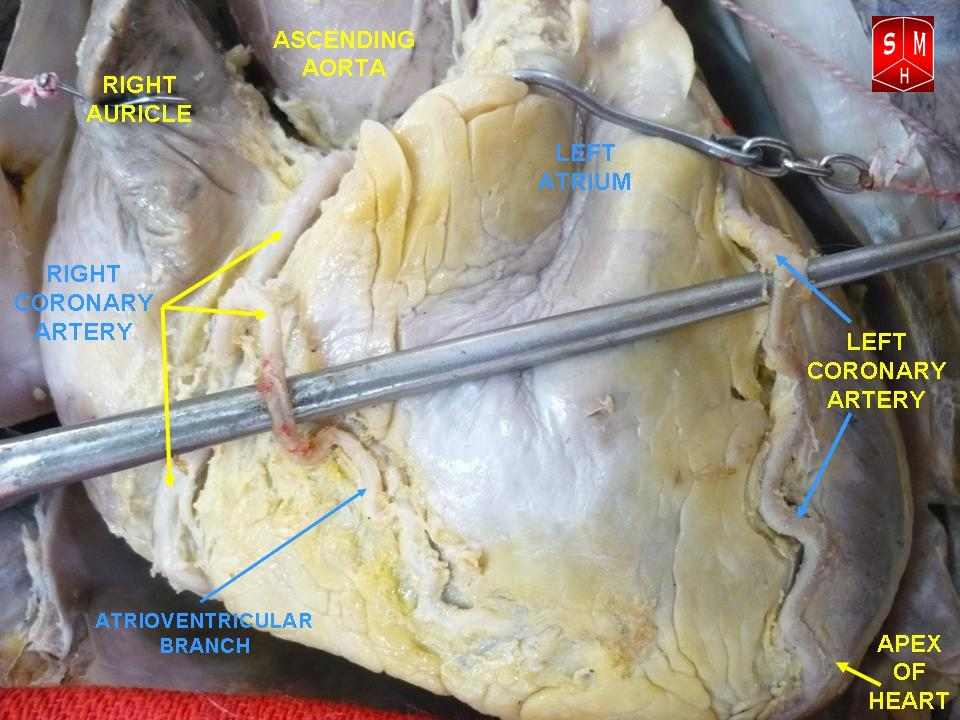
Left coronary artery

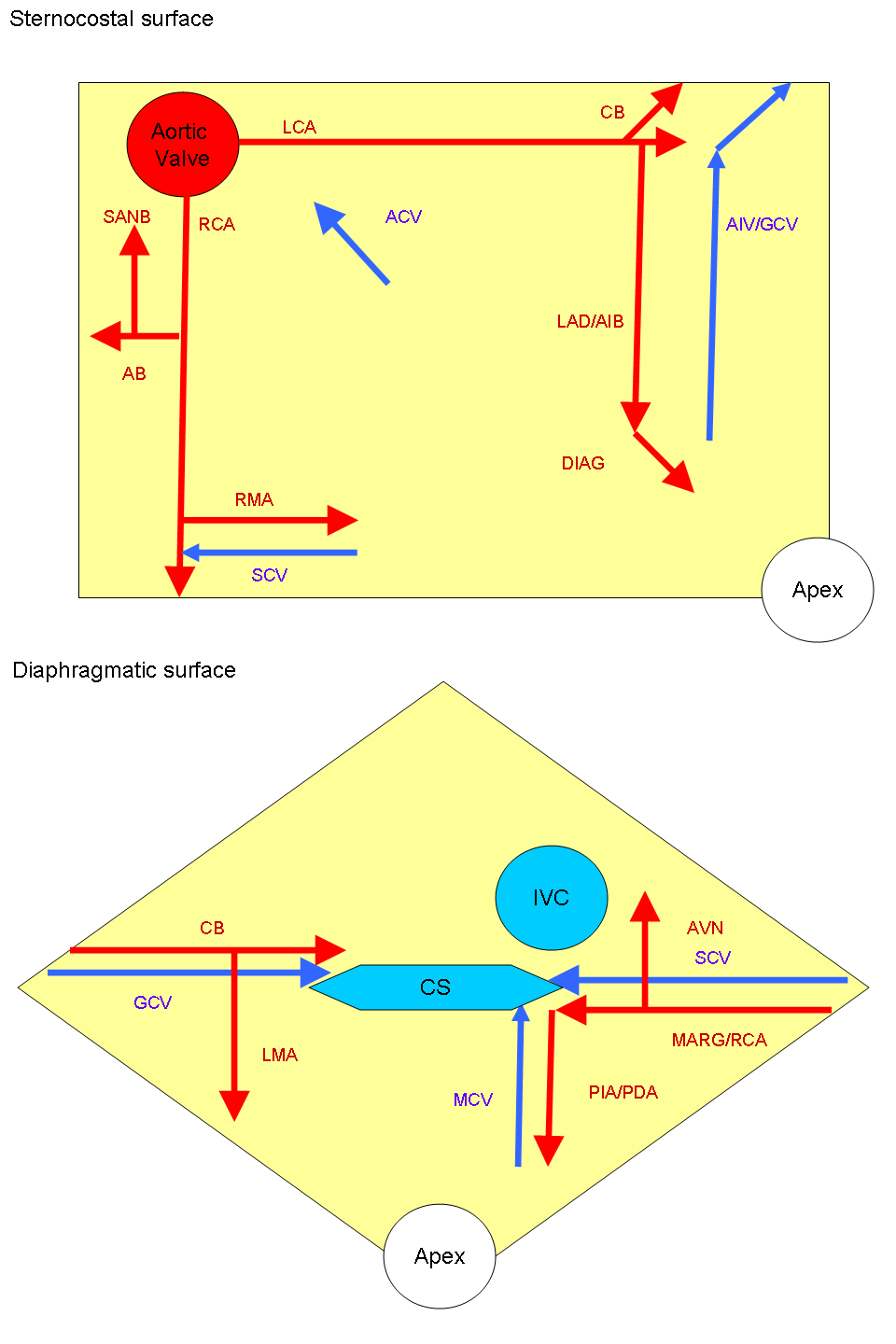
Cardiac vessels

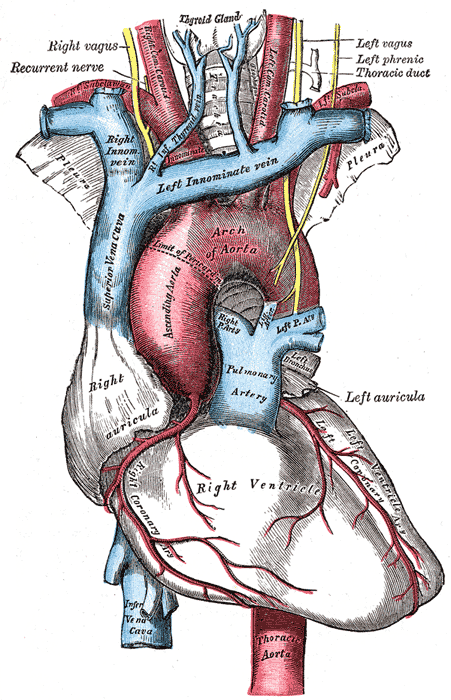
The aortic arch and its branches

Diagram of the arch

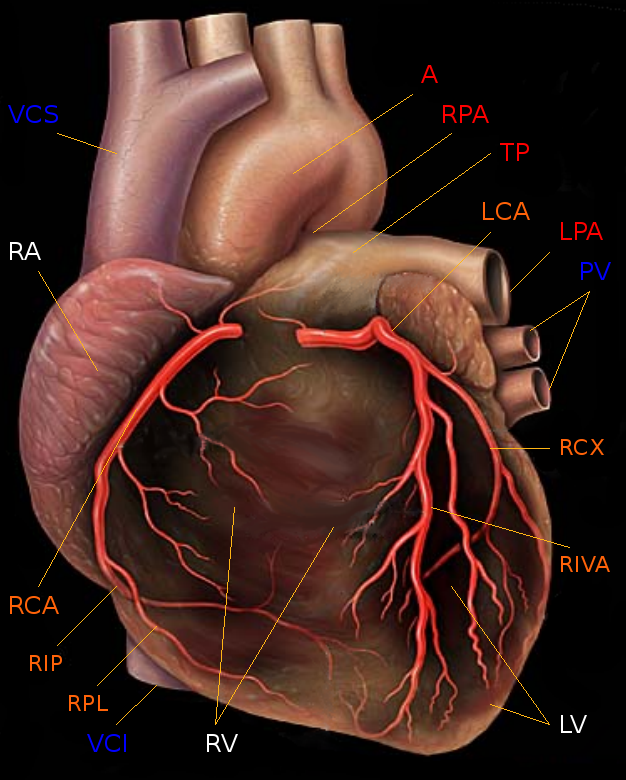
Human heart with coronary arteries

Heart left lateral coronaries diagram

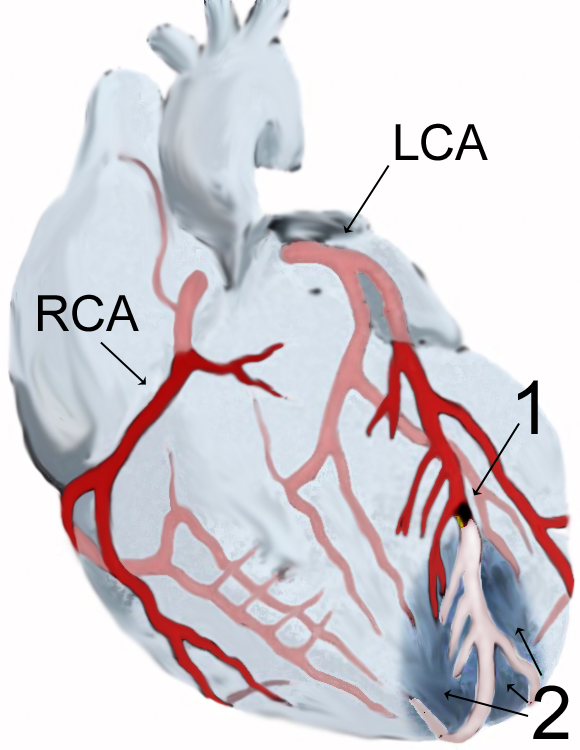
Diagram of a myocardial infarction

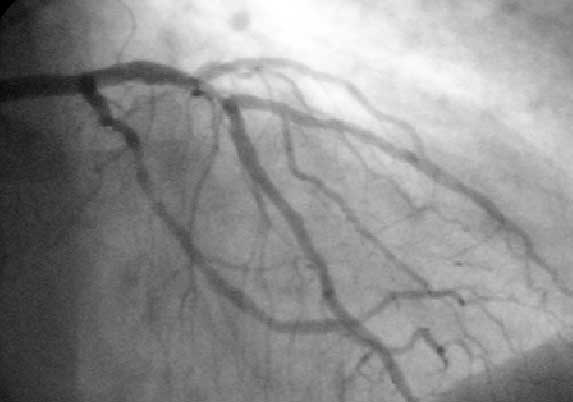
A coronary angiogram that shows the LMCA, LAD, and LCX

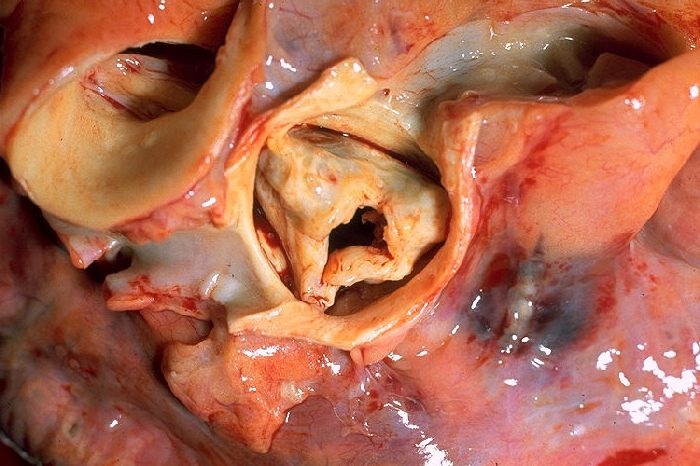
Autopsy specimen showing the coronary ostia and proximal segments of the coronary arteries. Compare with Gray's Anatomy drawing above.

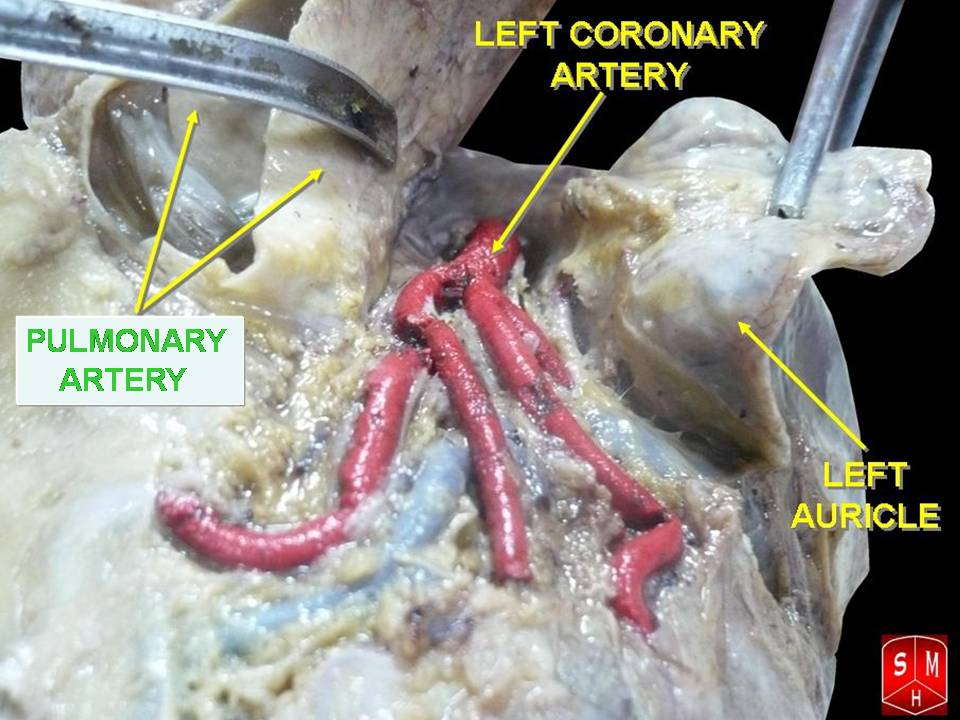
Left coronary artery

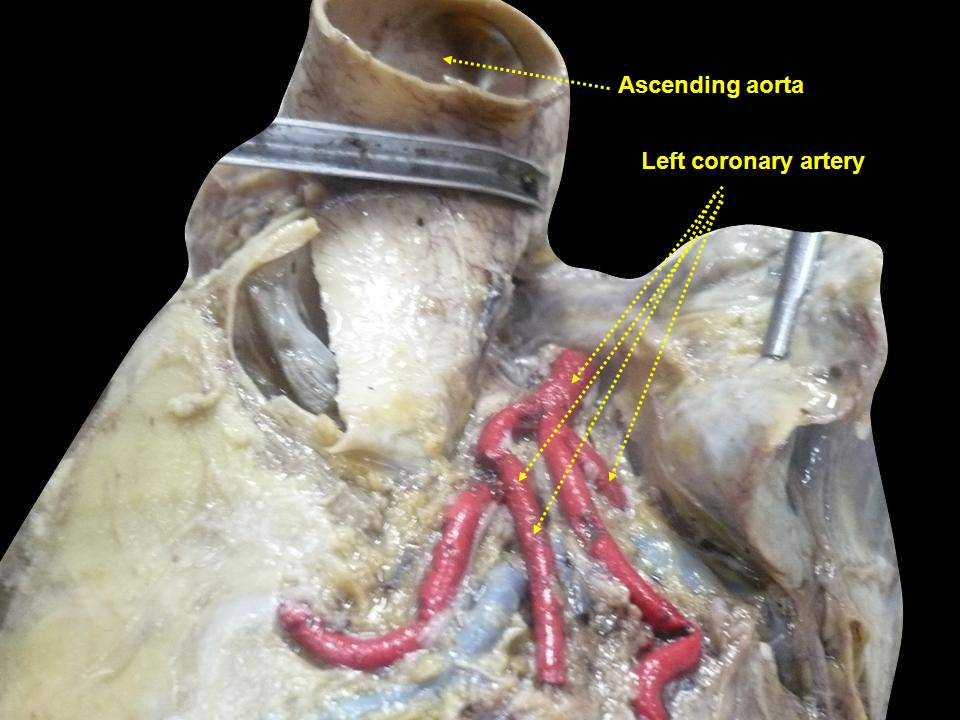
Left coronary artery. Plastination technique

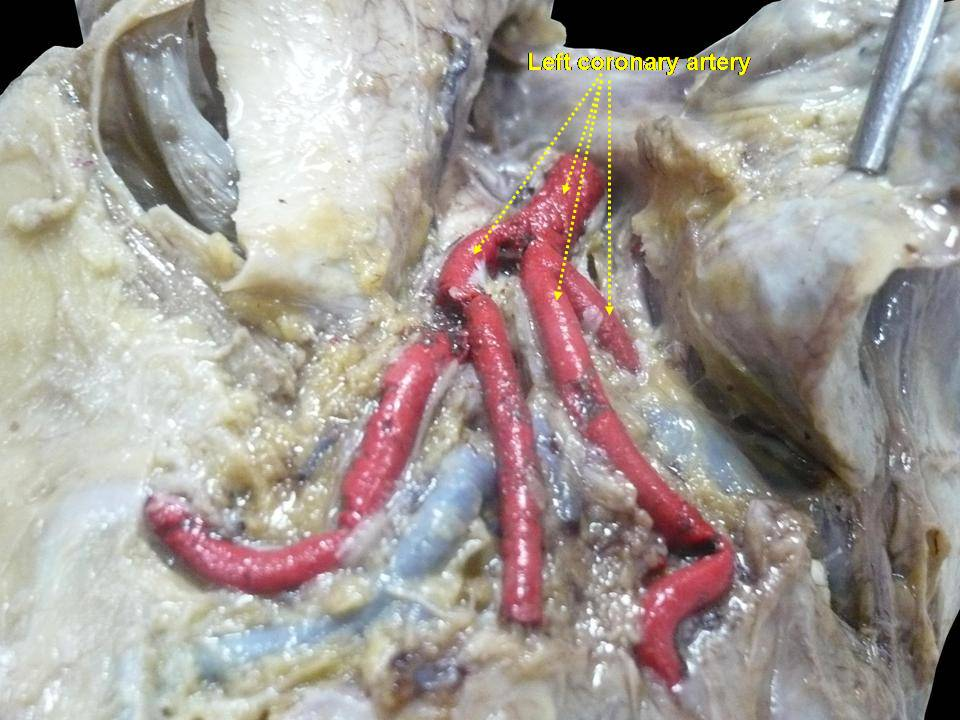
Left coronary artery. Plastination technique

== See also ==
- Coronary circulation
- Pete Maravich – American basketball player whose congenital lack of a left coronary artery lead to his death at age 40
