= Spontaneous coronary artery dissection =

Uncommon cause of heart attacks mostly affecting younger, healthy women

- Other names: Coronary artery dissection, SCAD
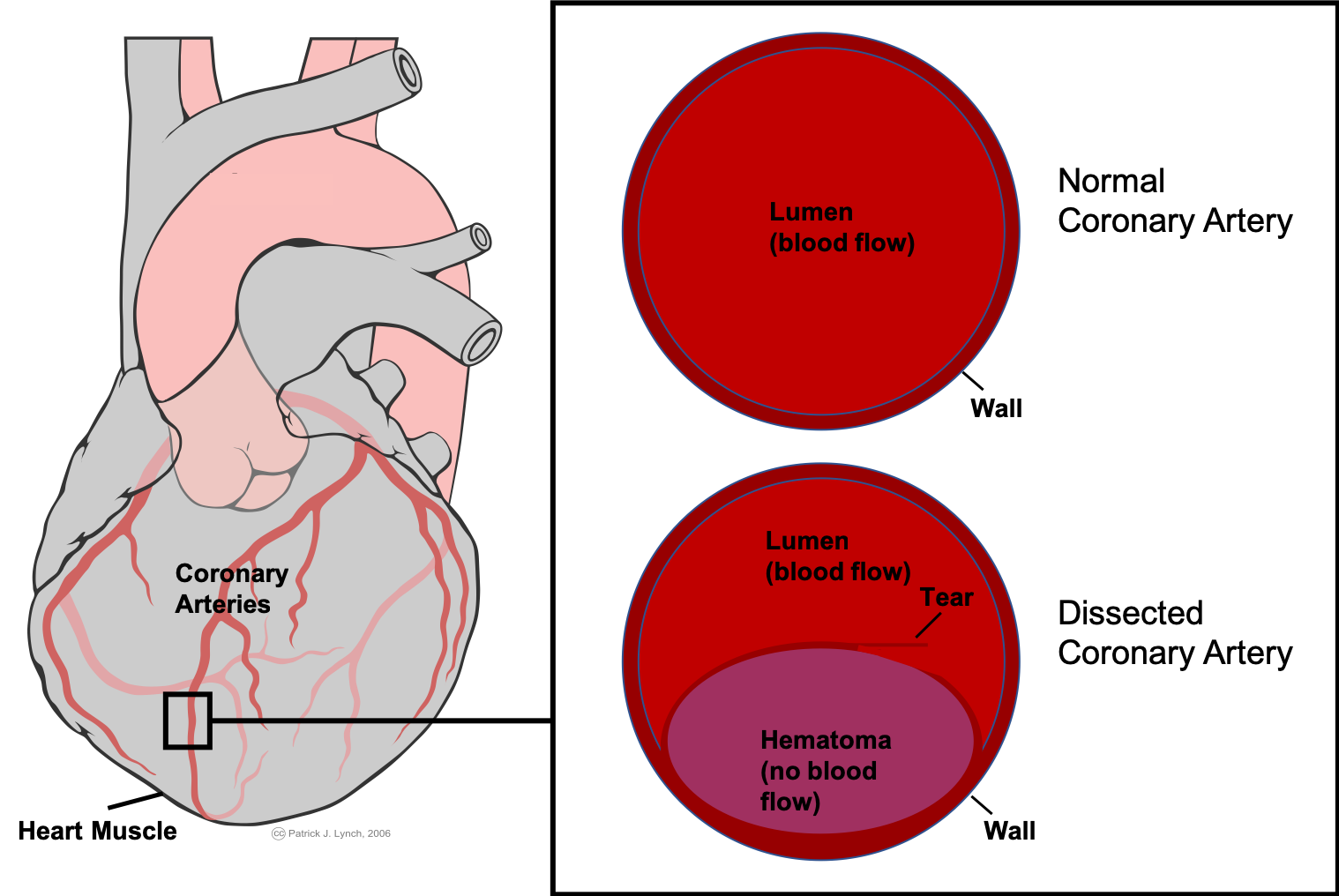
- Coronary artery dissection involves the formation of a hematoma (purple) within the walls of the coronary artery.
- Specialty: Cardiology
- Diagnostic method: ECG, Angiography, Intracoronary optical coherence tomography, Intravascular ultrasound, Coronary CT angiography

Spontaneous coronary artery dissection (SCAD) is an uncommon but potentially lethal condition in which one of the coronary arteries that supply the heart, spontaneously develops a blood collection, or hematoma, within the artery wall due to a tear in the wall. SCAD is one of the arterial dissections that can occur.

SCAD is a major cause of heart attacks in young, otherwise healthy women who usually lack typical cardiovascular risk factors. While the exact cause is not yet known, SCAD is likely related to changes that occur during and after pregnancy, or possibly genetics, hormonal influences, inflammatory issues or changes due to disease. These changes lead to the dissection of the wall which restricts blood flow to the heart and causes symptoms. SCAD is often diagnosed in the cath lab with angiography, though more advanced confirmatory tests exist. While the risk of death due to SCAD is low, it has a relatively high rate of recurrence leading to further heart attack-like symptoms in the future.

== Signs and symptoms ==
SCAD often presents like a heart attack in young to middle-aged, healthy women. This pattern usually includes chest pain, rapid heartbeat, shortness of breath, sweating, extreme tiredness, nausea, and dizziness. A minority of people with SCAD may also present in cardiogenic shock (2–5%), ventricular arrhythmias (3–11%), or after sudden cardiac death. Pregnancy- and postpartum-associated SCAD generally have worse outcomes compared to other cases.

== Causes ==
Risk factors include pregnancy and the postpartum period. Evidence suggests that estrogen- and progesterone-related vascular changes affect the coronary arteries during this period, contributing to SCAD. Some case reports and case series suggest associations with autoimmune inflammatory diseases, but there have not been larger studies to explore this relationship. Underlying heritable conditions such as fibromuscular dysplasia and connective-tissue disorders (e.g., Marfan syndrome, Ehlers–Danlos syndrome, and Loeys–Dietz syndrome) are associated with SCAD, SCAD triggers may include severe physical or emotional stress, but many cases have no obvious cause.

== Pathophysiology ==
SCAD symptoms are the result of a restriction in the size of the lumen of the affected coronary artery. A bleed within the wall of the artery (tunica intima) originating from the microvessels that perfuse this muscular layer (vasa vasorum) leads to a collection of blood, or hematoma, between the layers of the artery wall. The hematoma pushes close the lumen, preventing blood from flowing to the heart muscle (myocardium). In some cases (~30%) this hematoma (also referred to as an intramural hematoma) is also accompanied by a tear in the inner most layer of the artery - a monolayer of endothelial cells called the tunica intima. It is not clear if this precedes or follows a bleed within the wall of the artery. The tracking of blood within the artery wall (both in the presence or absence of an intimal tear) is referred to as a "false lumen". The restriction of blood flow in the 'true' lumen limits the availability of oxygen and nutrients to the heart muscle, or myocardium. As a result, the myocardium continues to demand oxygen but is not adequately supplied by the coronary artery. This imbalance leads to ischemia, damage, and in some cases can lead to death of the myocardium tissue, causing a heart attack (myocardial infarction).

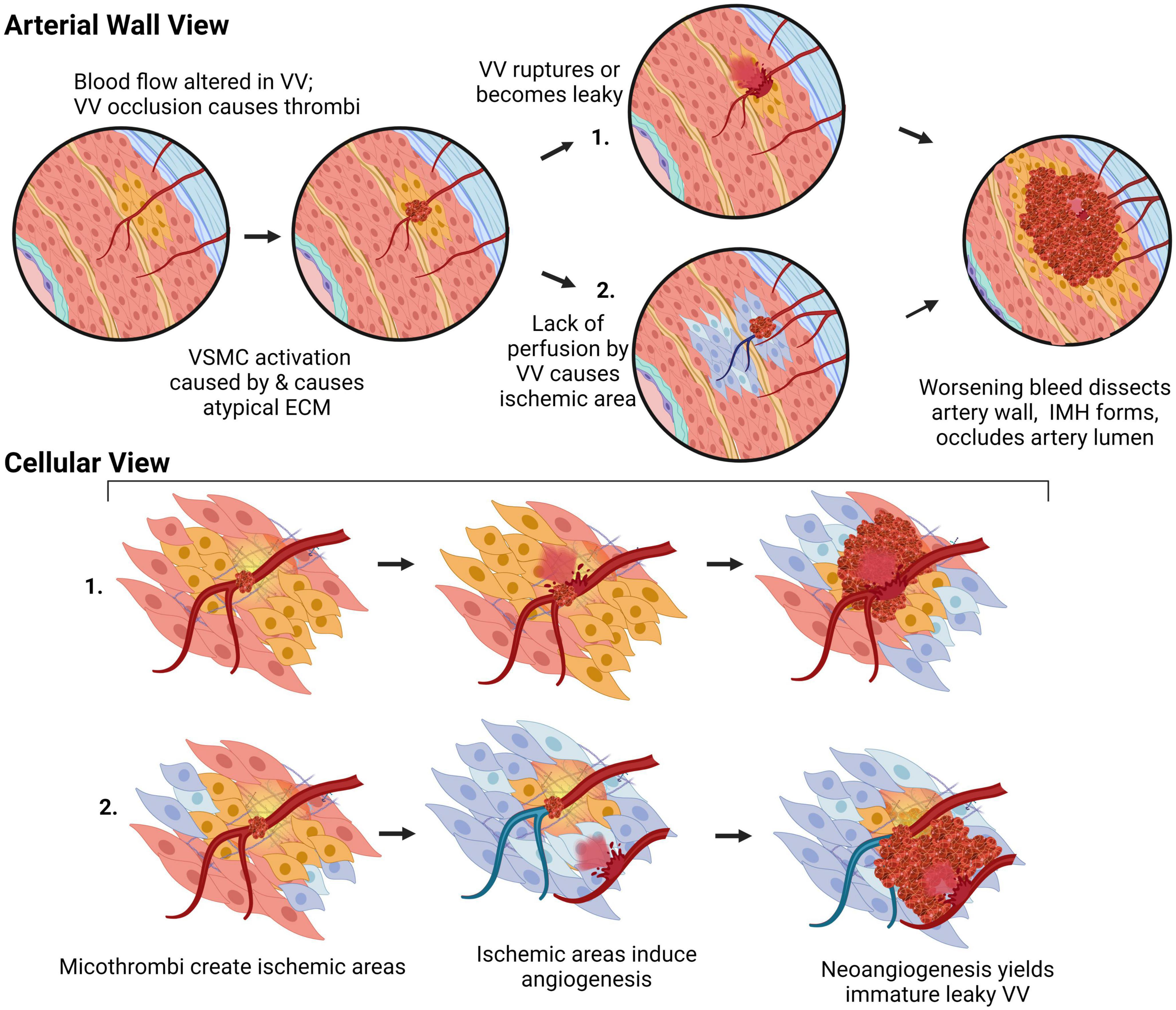
A proposed disease hypothesis for SCAD

=== Involvement of the Vasa Vasorum ===
While the molecular mechanisms that underpin SCAD are still poorly understood, studies have implicated dysfunction of the vasa vasorum, the microvessels that perfuse the muscular layer of the coronary artery, lead to the bleed. There is an inverse correlation between the amount of vasa vasorum present in regions of the coronary artery and the likelihood of an area being affected by a SCAD. It has been hypothesized that alterations in vessel wall strength, owing to dysfunction in the TGF-β pathway, the extracellular matrix, and vascular smooth muscle cell contractility alter the capacity of the vasa vasorum to perfuse the vessel wall, leading to either (1) a potential microthrombi and bleed, or (2) an area of hypoxia, which would likely induce new microvessel formation angiogenesis of new immature (and thus leaky) vessels.

== Genetics ==
It is likely that both genetics and environment play a role in SCAD onset. A number of genetic variants have been linked to an increased the risk of SCAD. As with dissection (medical) generally, the genes identified implicate dysfunction in four main cellular molecular pathways: the TGF-β pathway, extracellular matrix pathway, vascular smooth muscle cell contractility, and cellular metabolism. Variants in genes including ALDH18A1, COL3A1, COL4A1, FBN1 and ACVR1 were implicated in a study of 91 unrelated SCAD cases.

== Diagnosis ==
This is a representative video of coronary angiography. While it does not display SCAD, it highlights the technique used to identify the condition.

Given the demographics of SCAD, it is important to maintain a high index of suspicion for the condition in otherwise low-risk women presenting with symptoms of acute coronary syndrome. Initial evaluation may show ECG changes of ST elevation, like heart attacks due to other causes. SCAD comprises 2-4% of all cases of acute coronary syndrome.

With typically elevated cardiac biomarkers and ECG changes, people will often undergo coronary angiography evaluation. It is important to recognize SCAD through angiography as other confirmatory measures carry increased risks.

=== Angiography ===
There are 3 types of SCAD based on angiographic and anatomical criteria; with the designations based on the location and extent of the hematoma within the walls of the coronary arteries. Type 1 SCAD results from an intimal tear of the coronary artery (a tear of the innermost layer of the arterial wall) creating a false lumen as blood flows into the new space. A type 1 SCAD lesion is seen on angiography or intravascular imaging as a radiolucent flap separating the two flow channels; separating the false lumen from the true lumen of the coronary artery. Type 2 SCAD, the most common type of SCAD lesions, seen in 60-75% of patients, occurs due to an intramural hematoma or a collection of blood in the muscular layer of the coronary artery wall with the absence of intimal tearing. This is seen on coronary angiography as an abrupt change in coronary caliber with a long segment of a diffusely narrowed artery (typically longer than 20 mm). Type 2 SCAD is subdivided into type 2A where the narrowed segment of the coronary artery is flanked by normal caliber segments and type 2B where the stenosis continues to the terminus of a coronary artery. Type 3 SCAD, the least common type, is also due to an intramural hematoma causing coronary stenosis, but the lesions are shorter than as seen in type 2 SCAD, being less than 20 mm in length. Due to the short segment of coronary stenosis in type 3 SCAD, it is often difficult to differentiate type 3 SCAD lesions from coronary stenosis due to atherosclerotic plaques and intra-coronary imaging is often needed to distinguish between the two. Some authors have proposed a fourth designation of SCAD, type 4 SCAD, in which there is a complete intraluminal occlusion of the coronary artery due to any of the previously mentioned types (Type 1–3).

=== Intracoronary imaging ===
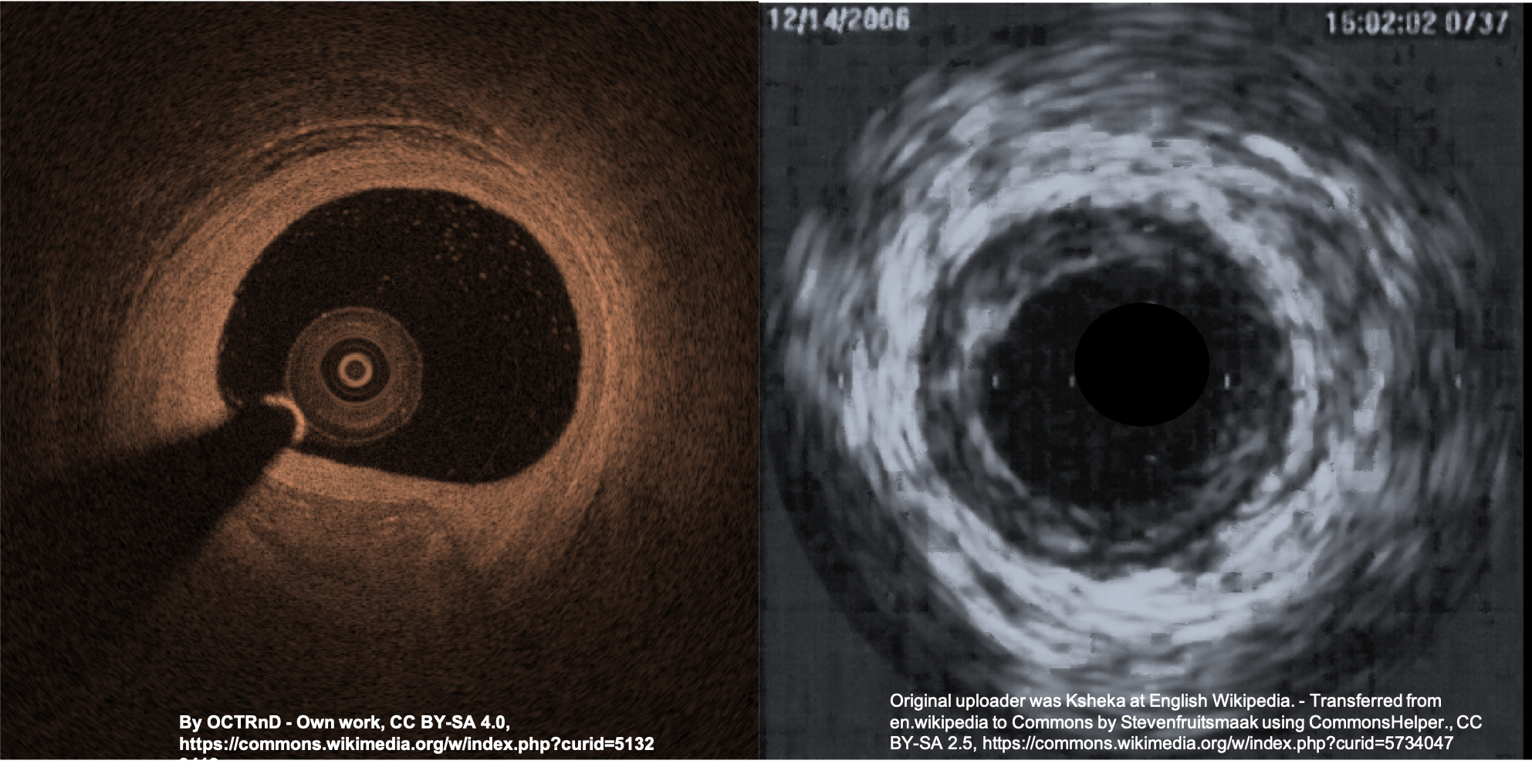
This is a representative image of two types of intracoronary imaging, OCT (left) and IVUS (right).

Intracoronary imaging (ICI), consisting of intracoronary optical coherence tomography (OCT) and intravascular ultrasound (IVUS) can help distinguish SCAD from an atherosclerotic lesion when it is difficult to do so with angiography. ICI techniques provide a direct view of the walls of the coronary artery to confirm SCAD, but may actually worsen the dissection as the probes are inserted into the damaged area. ICI confers a 3.4% risk of iatrogenic dissection in people with SCAD compared to 0.2% risk in the general population. Between the two ICI methods, OCT – a newer technique – has superior spatial resolution than IVUS and is the preferred technique if ICI is required, but the need to inject extra contrast with OCT poses risk for worsening the dissection.

=== Other methods ===
Some studies propose coronary CT angiography to evaluate SCAD in lower-risk people, with research into the approach ongoing.

== Management ==
Management depends upon the presenting symptoms. In most people who are hemodynamically stable without high-risk coronary involvement, conservative medical management with blood pressure control is recommended. In these people, especially if angiography demonstrates adequate coronary flow, the most likely course usually leads to spontaneous healing, often within 30 days. Anti-coagulation should be discontinued upon diagnosis of SCAD on coronary angiography as continuation of anti-coagulation may lead to hematoma and dissection propagation.

In cases involving high-risk coronaries, hemodynamic instability, or a lack of improvement or worsening after initial attempts at treatment, urgent treatment with coronary stents or coronary artery bypass surgery may be necessary. Stents carry the risk of worsening the dissection or have an increased risk of other complications as the vessel walls in SCAD are already weak due to the disease before introducing the stent. Large studies into coronary artery bypass surgery are lacking, but this approach is used to redirect blood to the heart around the affected area for cases involving the left main coronary artery or when other approaches fail.

Angina, or chest pain due to coronary insufficiency may persist for months after SCAD, sometimes even when repeat angiography shows vessel healing. Anti-anginal agents such as nitrates, calcium channel blockers and ranolazine are indicated as anti-anginal pharmacologic agents after SCAD. Control of hypertension is also indicated after SCAD, with beta blockers especially showing a reduction in the recurrence of SCAD. Statins are not recommended in the treatment post-SCAD (in the absence of other indications for statins) as the myocardial infarctions in SCAD are not the result of atherosclerotic plaques. Cardiac rehabilitation is recommended for all patients after myocardial infarction due to SCAD and is associated with a reduction in anginal symptoms increased psychological well-being. Dual antiplatelet therapy should be started after percutaneous coronary intervention (stents) is used to treat SCAD and continued for at least 1 year afterwards. Dual antiplatelet therapy during the acute phase and for at least 1 year after medically treated SCAD may be also used, based on expert consensus.

Physical stress is associated with SCAD recurrence but there are no heart rate, blood pressure or weight exercise parameters that are established in those with SCAD. In general, it is recommended that those with SCAD avoid isometric exercise, high intensity endurance training, exercising to the point of exhaustion and activities involving a prolonged Valsalva maneuver to reduce the risk of SCAD recurrence.

After addressing the SCAD, people are often treated with typical post-heart attack care, though people who are pregnant may need altered therapy due to the possibility of some teratogenic cardiac medications affecting fetal development. Depending on the clinical situation, providers may screen for associated connective tissue diseases.

== Prognosis ==
People with SCAD have a low in-hospital mortality after treatment. However, the lesion may worsen after leaving the hospital within the first month. One study suggested a 1.2% mortality rate following SCAD but a 19.9% risk for either death, heart attacks, or strokes. Even afterwards, SCAD has a high recurrence risk at 30% within 10 years, often at a different site than the initial lesion – meaning that stents placed in the location of the first lesion may not protect against a second. Recent reviews emphasize that although long-term survival is generally favorable, people with SCAD remain at increased risk of recurrent SCAD and other major adverse cardiovascular events and therefore require ongoing follow-up. Given the lack of consensus on the cause of SCAD, prevention of future SCAD may include medical therapy, counseling about becoming pregnant again (for those who had pregnancy-associated SCAD), or avoidance of estrogen therapy.

=== Preventative Research ===
Research is currently being carried out to identify what causes SCAD, in an effort to prevent recurrence, or potentially onset in at risk family members of SCAD patients. Australian researchers at the Victor Chang Cardiac Research Institute, for example, have generated induced pluripotent stem cell (iPSC) lines from patients to model SCAD 'in a dish'.

== Epidemiology ==
SCAD is the most common cause of heart attacks in pregnant and postpartum women. Over 90% of people who develop SCAD are women. It is especially common among women aged 43–52. With angiography and improved recognition of the condition, diagnosis of SCAD has improved since the early 2010s. While prior studies had reported a SCAD prevalence of less than 1% in patients presenting with acute coronary syndrome, more recent data suggests the prevalence of SCAD in acute coronary syndrome patients may be between 2–4%.

== History ==
SCAD was first described in the year 1931, at postmortem examination, in a 42-year-old woman. Due to a lack of recognition and diagnostic technology though, SCAD literature until the 21st century included only case reports and series. With the recent advent of coronary angiography and intracoronary imaging, recognition and diagnosis of SCAD has greatly increased, especially in the 2010s.

== See also ==
- Dissection (medical)
- Aortic dissection
- Kounis syndrome
