= Giovanni J. Ughi =

Italian engineer and inventor

- Education: University of Padova; Katholieke Universiteit Leuven; Harvard Medical School;
- Known for: optical coherence tomography; intravascular fluorescence; Image processing;
- Awards: Bullock-Wellman Postdoctoral Fellowship, Harvard Medical School, (2014)
- Scientific career
- Fields: Biomedical Optics, Vascular disease, Endoscopy, Medical Imaging, coronary artery, neurovascular
- Workplaces: Harvard University, Harvard Medical School, Massachusetts General Hospital, KU Leuven, University of Massachusetts Medical School

Giovanni J. Ughi (born Padova, Italy), engineer and scientist, contributed to the development of intravascular optical coherence tomography.

He contributed to the invention of multimodality optical coherence tomography (OCT) and Laser-induced fluorescence molecular imaging, pioneering a first-in-man study of coronary arteries during his work at Massachusetts General Hospital and Harvard Medical School. The results of this work, combining two imaging technologies, may better identify dangerous coronary plaques, responsible for coronary artery disease and myocardial infarction.. He also contributed to the development of targeted molecular imaging of human atherosclerosis, determining the use of molecular agents (e.g., indocyanine green (ICG)-enhanced near-infrared fluorescence) to illuminate high-risk features of human atherosclerotic plaques, arterial inflammation and plaque progression, and for the identification of unhealed stents at higher risk of stent thrombosis.

He also contributed to the development and clinical translation of intravascular optical coherence tomography for neurovascular imaging.

Dr. Ughi also made significant contributions to the development of image processing and AI methods for the automated analysis of intracoronary optical coherence tomography (OCT) images, contributing to the widespread adoption of intracoronary OCT imaging technology. He is recognized for the development of methods for the automatic quantification of stent and disease characteristics on intracoronary optical coherence tomography images.

He has authored over seventy papers in peer-reviewed scientific international journals.
