= Cardiac allograft vasculopathy =

- Coronary arteries
- Specialty: Cardiology, angiology
- Symptoms: None, breathlessness, tiredness
- Usual onset: After heart transplantation
- Diagnostic method: Coronary angiography, intravascular ultrasound, dobutamine stress echocardiography, positron emission tomography, CT angiography, biomarkers, endomyocardial biopsy
- Treatment: Control cardiovascular risk factors, mTOR inhibitors, re-transplantation
- Medication: Sirolimus, everolimus
- Prognosis: Progressive
- Frequency: Around 50% (in 10 years)
- Deaths: 11-13% of heart transplants one year from surgery

Cardiac allograft vasculopathy (CAV) is a progressive type of coronary artery disease in people who have had a heart transplant. Because the donor heart has lost its nerve supply, chest pain is usually absent, and CAV is often found during routine tests. It may present with symptoms including tiredness and breathlessness.

The condition arises when the blood vessels supplying the transplanted heart change in structure. These vessels narrow and restrict blood flow to the heart, subsequently leading to impairment of the heart muscle or sudden death. In addition to the same risk factors for coronary artery disease due to the build up of plaque, CAV is more likely to occur if the donor was older or died from explosive brain death, and if there is cytomegalovirus infection. Its mechanism involves immunological (innate and adaptive) and nonimmunological factors, with distinct features on histological samples of coronary arteries. Other major causes of death following heart transplantation include graft failure, organ rejection and infection.

Diagnosis is by regular follow-up and monitoring of the transplanted heart for early signs of disease. Tests include coronary angiography, intravascular ultrasound, dobutamine stress echocardiography, positron emission tomography, computed tomographic angiography (CT angiography) and several biomarkers.

Statins and aspirin are commenced early after transplantation and on detection of CAV. Medications including sirolimus and everolimus can slow disease progression. A repeat heart transplantation may be required.

CAV affects around half of heart transplant recipients within 10 years. It contributes to the death of 11-13% one year from heart transplantation.

== Definition ==
Cardiac allograft vasculopathy is an accelerated type of coronary artery disease in people who have had a heart transplantation.

== Signs and symptoms ==
Unlike the chest tightness of angina in those who have not had a heart transplant, people with CAV typically do not experience chest pain because the donor heart has lost its nerve supply. A few regain nerves some years later and may develop unusual chest pain. People with CAV may present with a broad spectrum of symptoms including tiredness, nausea, or abdominal discomfort or may have no symptoms at all. Shortness of breath and arrhythmias may also occur.

== Risk factors ==
Similar to coronary artery disease in those who have not had a heart transplant, risk factors to CAV include high blood pressure, high cholesterol, and diabetes mellitus. Other risk factors exclusive to CAV include older donors, cytomegalovirus infection and circulating antibodies after heart transplantation. The mechanism of donor brain death, particularly explosive brain death in the donor has been shown to be a significant factor. It is probably the combination of injuries to the allograft that determine the risk of developing CAV.

== Mechanism ==
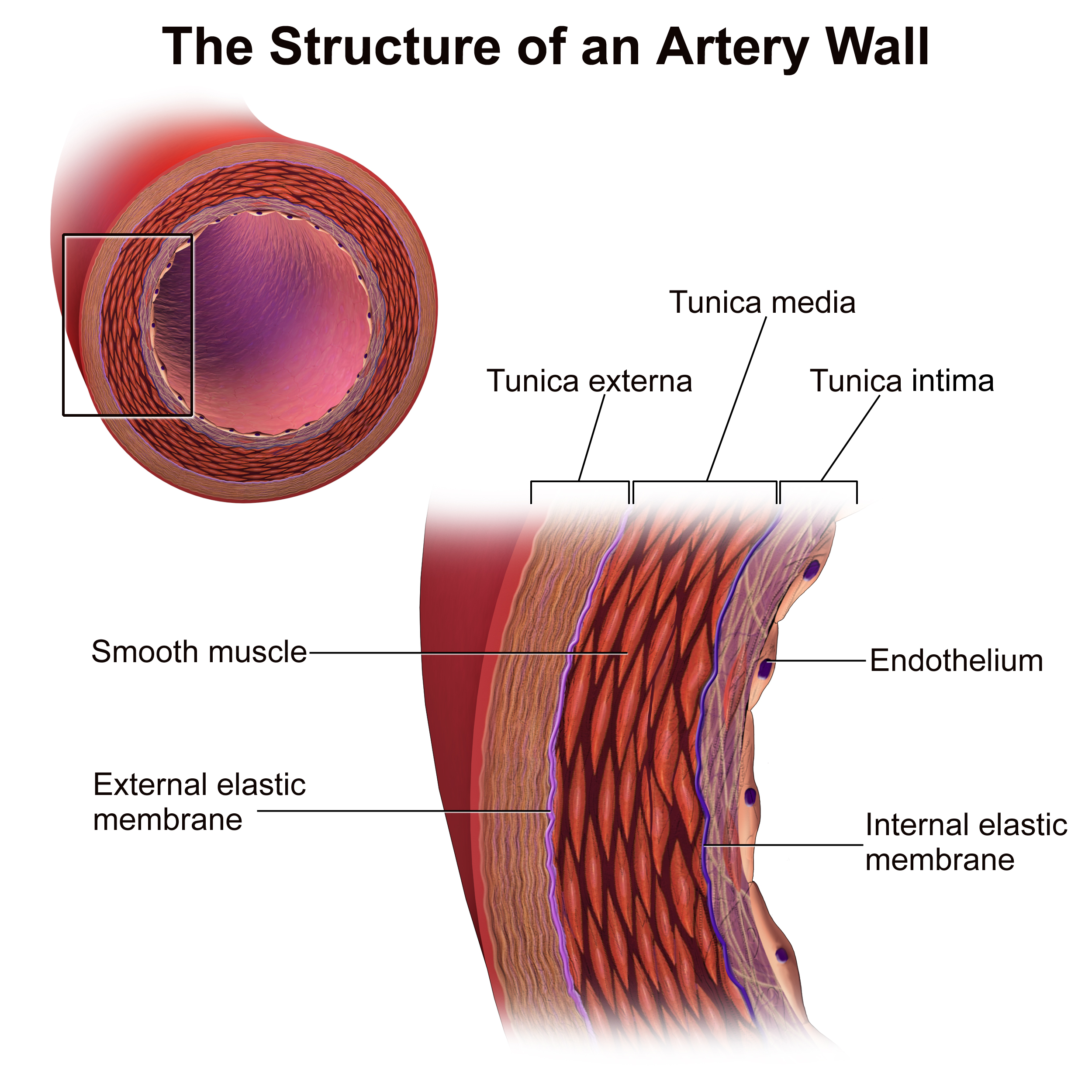
Artery wall structure, showing intimal layer

Immunological (innate and adaptive) and nonimmunological factors contribute to the complex pathogenesis of CAV.

In those nontransplanted people who develop coronary artery disease due to atherosclerosis, progression of disease is slow, histological changes are confined mainly to the main coronary arteries and arterial dilatation is observed as a form of compensatory remodelling. However, in CAV, histology specimens typically show concentric thickening of the intimal layer of the main coronary arteries on the surface of the heart and in intramyocardial arteries which can become obliterated within a few years. There is smooth muscle cell migration, foamy macrophages and lymphocytic infiltrates. This can be seen to affect the whole length of the coronary arteries and often the smaller arteries. Calcification does not always occur in CAV and if it does appear, it happens late. The compensatory arterial dilation does not occur in CAV. Unlike in nontransplanted people with coronary artery disease due to atherosclerosis, in CAV occlusion with thrombus of the vessel lumen is rare.

Inflammation and endothelial injury can be triggered by the donor arrest, organ procurement, and allograft ischaemia and reperfusion.

== Diagnosis ==
As symptoms are so variable and often absent, diagnosis has been a challenge. Hence, regular follow-up and monitoring of the allograft for early signs of disease is advocated.

=== Coronary angiography ===
Surveillance is performed by regularly repeating coronary angiography in the cardiac catheterization laboratory, the diagnostic test of choice. This is typically performed annually for the first five years after transplantation. Angiography in CAV characteristically demonstrates diffuse stenoses in large coronary arteries and a reduced number of smaller coronary arteries, also known as "peripheral pruning". However, because CAV frequently affects the entire length of the coronary artery, CAV may not be apparent by angiography alone.

=== Intravascular ultrasound (IVUS) ===
Intravascular ultrasound (IVUS) is more sensitive at reliably detecting subtle changes in the thickness of the intimal layer of the artery walls and provide measurements of artery lumen. Following transplantation, serial measurements are compared to the baseline. A greater than 0.5 mm increase in intimal thickness one year after transplantation is predictive of CAV changes on angiography within five years. The paradoxical reduction in the number of blood vessels, can also be detected by intravascular ultrasound.

IVUS, however, tends to be used for research due to its drawbacks of being invasive, requiring the use of contrast material and cost.

=== Dobutamine stress-echocardiography (DSE) ===
Alternatively, dobutamine stress echocardiography (DSE) is commonly performed and has an 85% sensitivity for the presence of CAV. A negative DSE correlates with a good prognosis.

Other noninvasive diagnostics include positron emission tomography and computed tomographic angiography (CT angiography). In addition, ECGs may show atypical features of ischaemia.

=== Biomarkers ===
Biomarkers for increased risk of CAV include C-reactive protein, serum brain natriuretic peptide and troponin I have been suggested.

Patterns

CAV is associated with a variety of histological patterns. While it can be typical for CAV to appear in a heterogenous fashion, there are patterns that have been observed more frequently. Most commonly seen are fibroproliferative and atheromatous tissue patterns, followed by lesser common vasculitic and thrombotic patterns.

=== Classification ===
The degree of CAV after heart transplantation has been obtained from a variety of sources including The Cardiac Transplant Research Database, the ISHLT registry and The United Network for Organ Sharing registry.

The International Society for Heart and Lung Transplantation (ISHLT) have formulated and standardized a terminology, based on diagnostic findings, to define the presence and severity of CAV, which in turn reflects prognosis. The severity of CAV is defined by the degree of narrowing of the coronary arteries and the presence of restrictive heart disease.

| Code | Severity | Diagnostic findings |
|---|---|---|
| ISHLT CAV0 | Not significant | No detectable lesions on angiography |
| ISHLT CAV1 | Mild | Angiographic left main (LM) 􏰁50%, or primary vessel with maximum lesion of 􏰁70%, or any branch stenosis 􏰁70% (including diffuse narrowing) without allograft dysfunction |
| ISHLT CAV2 | Moderate | Angiographic LM 􏰁50%; a single primary vessel 􏰄70%, or isolated branch stenosis 􏰄70% in branches of 2 systems, without allograft dysfunction |
| ISHLT CAV3 | Severe | Angiographic LM 􏰄50%, or two or more primary vessels 􏰄70% stenosis, or isolated branch stenosis 􏰄70% in all 3 systems; or ISHLT CAV1 or CAV2 with allograft dysfunction (defined as LVEF 􏰅45% usually in the presence of regional wall motion abnormalities) or evidence of significant restrictive physiology |

== Treatment ==
Primary angioplasty procedure in a person who had CAV after heart transplantation.

=== Statins ===
Prevention of CAV progression is important as once developed, CAV existing treatments are often ineffective. Commencing the statins pravastatin and simvastatin early after transplantation reduces the incidence and severity of CAV.

=== Vitamins ===
When combined with immunosuppressants, the progression of CAV could possibly be slowed by vitamins C and E.

=== Aspirin ===
Since the role of aspirin is already established in coronary artery disease in those who have not had a heart transplant, it is usually given after heart transplantation too.

=== Antiproliferative agents ===
On detection of CAV, medications including mTOR inhibitors sirolimus and everolimus have been shown to slow disease progression.

=== Other treatment options ===
Clinically significant CAV may require percutaneous coronary interventions for focal disease, but the likelihood of restenosis is high. A repeat heart transplantation may be considered.

== Outcome ==
Once there is reduced left ventricular ejection fraction and symptoms of heart failure, the outcome is typically poor. The risk of major adverse cardiovascular events is increased by 3.4 fold if CAV is present on angiography.

== Epidemiology ==
The frequency of CAV after heart transplantation has been obtained from a variety of sources including The Cardiac Transplant Research Database, the ISHLT registry and The United Network for Organ Sharing registry. In comparison to between 1994 and 2001, there has been a decline in incidence of CAV between 2001 and 2007. ISHLT figures show an incidence of CAV of around 50% at 10 years after heart transplantation.

CAV is a leading cause of late mortality following heart transplantation. Most are not severe but it contributes to the death of 11-13% one year from heart transplantation.

== History ==
Unlike rejection and infection, CAV in the transplanted heart was not initially a predicted outcome. Early survivors of heart transplants soon developed this form of vasculopathy of their coronary arteries, initially identified at post-mortems. There were early suggestions that preventing cytomegalovirus (CMV) infection could decrease the prevalence of CAV. The impact of CAV has changed over time, with early recipients being younger, having more rejection and cardiovascular risk factors and less use of statins. Later recipients used statins routinely and were introduced to the immunosuppressive agent mycophenolate mofetil (MMF) and CMV prophylaxis. In addition, the later recipients were monitored for antibody-mediated cardiac allograft rejection (AMR).

Before 2010 there was no uniform international standards for the nomenclature of CAV. A consensus statement on a standard language for CAV was first published in 2010 by the ISHLT. This was devised in a similar way to the earlier acute rejection grading system by endomyocardial biopsy.

== Research directions ==
Antibody-mediated cardiac allograft rejection (AMR) is a significant factor leading to the rapid progression of CAV. Future research directions in this area may include prospective databases that correlate clinical factors with surveillance of the incidence and severity of AMR, the frequency of CMV infection, and the use of immunosuppressants. The role of inducing immune tolerance has yet to be established.
