= Intravascular imaging =

Subset of medical imaging

- Purpose: provides detailed and accurate measurements of vessel lumen morphology

Intravascular imaging is a catheter based system that allows physicians such as interventional cardiologists to acquire images of diseased vessels from inside the artery. Intravascular imaging provides detailed and accurate measurements of vessel lumen morphology, vessel size, extension of diseased artery segments, vessel size and plaque characteristics. Examples of intravascular imaging modalities are intravascular ultrasound (IVUS) and intracoronary optical coherence tomography (OCT or IVOCT).

== See also ==
- Fractional flow reserve
- Intracoronary Optical Coherence Tomography
- intravascular ultrasound
