= Coronary CT angiography =

Use of computed tomography angiography to assess the coronary arteries of the heart

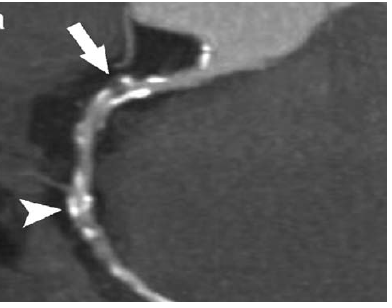
- Image of contrast enhanced dual-source coronary CT-angiograph
- ICD-9-CM: 87.41
- OPS-301 code: 3-224

Coronary CT angiography (CTA or CCTA) is the use of computed tomography (CT) angiography to assess the coronary arteries of the heart. The patient receives an intravenous injection of radiocontrast and then the heart is scanned using a high speed CT scanner, allowing physicians to assess the extent of occlusion in the coronary arteries, usually in order to diagnose coronary artery disease.

CTA is superior to coronary CT calcium scan in determining the risk of Major Adverse Cardiac Events (MACE).

== Medical uses ==
Faster CT machines, due to multidetector capabilities, have made imaging of the heart and circulatory system very practical in a number of clinical settings. The faster capability has allowed the imaging of the heart with minimal involuntary motion, which creates motion blur on the image, and has a number of practical applications. It may be useful in the diagnosis of suspected coronary heart disease, for follow-up of a coronary artery bypass, for the evaluation of valvular heart disease and for the evaluation of cardiac masses.

It is uncertain whether this modality will replace invasive coronary catheterization. At present, it appears that the greatest utility of cardiac CT lies in ruling out coronary artery disease rather than ruling it in. This is because the test is highly sensitive (over 90% detection rate), so a negative test result largely rules out coronary artery disease (i.e., the test has a high negative predictive value). The test is somewhat less specific, however, so a positive result is less conclusive and may need to be confirmed by subsequent invasive angiography.

The positive predictive value of cardiac CTA is approximately 82% and the negative predictive value is around 93%. This means for every 100 patients who appear to have coronary artery disease after CT angiography, 18 of them actually won't have it, and that for every 100 patients who have a negative CT angio test result (i.e., the test says they do not have coronary artery disease), 7 will actually have the disease as defined by the reference standard of invasive coronary angiography via cardiac catheterization. Both coronary CT angiography and invasive angiography via cardiac catheterization yield similar diagnostic accuracy when both are being compared to a third reference standard such as intravascular ultrasound or fractional flow reserve.

In addition to the diagnostic abilities, cardiac CTA beholds important prognostic information. Stenosis severity and extent of coronary artery disease are important prognostic indicators. However, one of the unique features of cardiac CTA is the fact that it enables the visualization of the vessel wall, in a non-invasive manner. Therefore, the technique is able to identify characteristics of coronary artery disease that are associated with the development of acute coronary syndrome.

== Side effects ==
Because the heart is effectively imaged more than once (described above), cardiac CT angiography can result in a relatively high radiation exposure (around 12 millisievert), although newer acquisition protocols, have recently been developed which drastically reduce this exposure to around 1 mSv (cfr. Pavone, Fioranelli, Dowe: Computed Tomography of Coronary Arteries, Springer 2009). By comparison, a chest X-ray carries a dose of approximately 0.02-0.2 mSv and natural background radiation exposure is around 2.3 mSv/year. Thus, each cardiac CT scan carried out with current protocols (dose approximately 1 mSv) is equivalent to approximately 5-50 chest X-rays or less than 1 year of background radiation. Methods are available to decrease this exposure, however, such as prospectively decreasing radiation output based on the concurrently acquired ECG (i.e., tube current modulation.) This can result in a significant decrease in radiation exposure, at the risk of compromising image quality if there is any arrhythmia during the acquisition.

The significance of the low radiation doses used in diagnostic imaging is unknown, although the possibility of increasing cancer incidence across a population is of significant concern. This potential risk must be weighed against the competing risk of not diagnosing a significant health problem in a particular individual, such as coronary artery disease.

=== Contraindications ===
Pregnancy is considered a relative contraindication, similarly to many forms of medical imaging in pregnancy. The potential harms to a fetus include the application of X-rays in addition to radiocontrast. Since an iodine-containing contrast agent is used, severe contrast agent allergy, uncontrolled hyperthyroidism or renal function impairment are also relative contraindications. Cardiac arrhythmias, coronary artery stents and tachycardia may result in a reduced image quality.

== Improved resolution ==
With the advent of subsecond rotation combined with multi-slice CT (up to 320 slices), high resolution and high speed can be obtained at the same time, allowing excellent imaging of the coronary arteries (cardiac CT angiography). Images with even higher temporal resolution can be obtained using multi-cycle (also called multi-segmental) image reconstruction.

In this technique, a portion of the heart is imaged during one heart cycle while an ECG trace is recorded. During the next heart cycle, the next portion of the heart is scanned for up to 5 total cycles until the entire heart is imaged. The reconstruction algorithm then combines the images from these different cycles to generate one complete image. The advantage of this method is that each image segment is acquired in less time as compared to acquiring the entire heart in one heart cycle, thus improving temporal resolution. The disadvantages are 1) the potential for image artifacts from fusing the image segments and 2) the requirement of additional X-ray radiation for image acquisition.

Dual Source CT scanners, introduced in 2005, allow higher temporal resolution by acquiring a full CT slice in only half a rotation, thus reducing motion blurring at high heart rates and potentially allowing for shorter breath-hold time. This is particularly useful for ill patients having difficulty holding their breath or unable to take heart-rate lowering medication.

The speed advantages of 64-slice MSCT have rapidly established it as the minimum standard for newly installed CT scanners intended for cardiac scanning. Manufacturers have developed 320-slice and true 'volumetric' scanners, primarily for their improved cardiac scanning performance.

Introduction of a CT scanner with a 160 mm detector in 2014 allows for imaging of the whole heart in a single beat without motion of the coronary arteries, regardless of patient heart rate.

The latest MSCT scanners acquire images only at 70-80% of the R-R interval (late diastole). This prospective gating can reduce effective dose from 10 to 15 mSv to as little as 1.2 mSv in follow-up patients acquiring at 75% of the R-R interval. Effective dose using MSCT coronary imaging can average less than the dose in conventional coronary angiography.
