= Multi-Ethnic Study of Atherosclerosis =

The Multi-Ethnic Study of Atherosclerosis (abbreviated MESA) is an ongoing medical study which aims to investigate the characteristics of subclinical atherosclerosis and other cardiovascular diseases, and to determine risk factors for its progression to the clinically overt form of these diseases. Sponsored by the National Heart, Lung and Blood Institute, MESA was begun in July 2000, and it follows a population-based sample of 6,814 American men and women aged 45 to 84, recruited from six field centers. The diverse sample consists of 38% White subjects, 28% African American, 22% Hispanic, and 12% Asian (primarily Chinese). (Note: When the subjects were originally recruited, their ethnic composition was as follows: 38% White, 28% African-American, 23% Hispanic, and 11% Asian.) Over 2,500 peer-reviewed papers have been published based on MESA and its 145 independent ancillary studies (as of 2025).

== Timeline ==
Originally established in 1999, MESA began recruiting subjects in July 2000 for a baseline examination, which was completed in September 2002. The patients were recruited from each of the study's six field centers, which were located in Baltimore, Maryland; Chicago, Illinois; Forsyth County, North Carolina; Los Angeles, California; New York, New York; and St. Paul, Minnesota. The baseline exam measured the subjects' coronary calcification and ventricular mass, among other outcomes. Subsequent analyses of these coronary calcium data, including work by Philip Greenland and colleagues, showed that adding calcium scores to traditional risk factors improves classification of coronary heart disease risk. Three subsequent examinations, each of which lasted from 17 to 20 months, were subsequently conducted, and a fifth examination lasted from April 2010 to January 2012.
