= Probe positioning system =

Medical tool

A probe positioning system is a tool for the positioning of a (hand-held) measuring device, such as an ultrasound transducer in a fixed, predetermined place to the object, such as a patient. The operation of these systems varies from completely manual, to completely automated.

In (semi-) automated probe positioning systems, a control system corrects for the movement of the object or disturbances in the environment. These systems can use a tilt, pressure or other sensor carried by the probe to collect positional data. The positioner, such as a robotic arm is coupled to the probe. The positioner can provide roll and pitch control as well as translating the probe in lateral and longitudinal directions. A processor receives signals from the sensors corresponding to the actual orientation of the probe and controls the positioner to adjust the orientation of the probe until the desired position is achieved.
