= Arthur Agatston =

American cardiologist

- Born: January 22, 1947 (age 79)
- Education: New York University School of Medicine (MD); Montefiore Medical Center (internal medicine residency); NYU (cardiology fellowship)
- Known for: South Beach Diet; Agatston score
- Medical career
- Field: Cardiology
- Institutions: Mount Sinai Medical Center & Miami Heart Institute; Baptist Health South Florida
- Notable works: The South Beach Diet (book series)

Arthur Agatston (born January 22, 1947) is an American cardiologist and world-renowned physician best known as the developer of the South Beach Diet. He has authored hundreds of scholarly papers in the field of noninvasive cardiac diagnostics. His scientific research led to the Agatston score for measuring coronary artery calcium (best known as the calcium score).

== Education ==
Agatston earned an MD at New York University School of Medicine in 1973, studied internal medicine at Montefiore Medical Center at the Albert Einstein College of Medicine and completed his cardiology fellowship at NYU.

== Career ==
Agatston started his medical career on staff at New York University Medical Center. After a year, he took a position at the Mount Sinai Medical Center & Miami Heart Institute in Miami Beach, Florida, where he later became director of the non-invasive cardiac lab. He then served as the medical director of wellness & prevention at Baptist Health South Florida. Dr. Agatston is now the CEO of The Agatston Center, a multidisciplinary preventive practice in Miami with notable physicians Cindy Shaffer, MD, Oren Mechanic, MD, James Trice, MD, and Judi Woolger, MD.
