= Intravascular fluorescence =

Intracoronary fluorescence
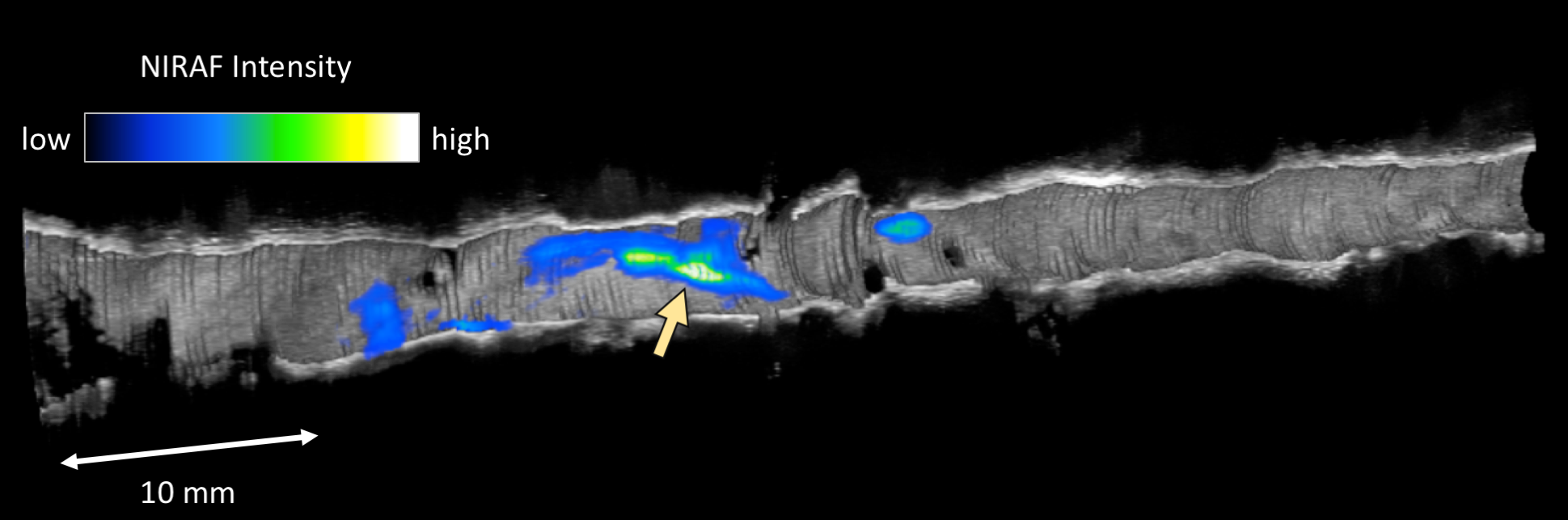
- Example of intracoronary fluorescence in combination with intracoronary optical coherence tomography to better identify molecular processed of atherosclerosis.

Intravascular fluorescence is a catheter-based molecular imaging technique that uses near-infrared fluorescence to detect artery wall autofluorescence (NIRAF) or fluorescence generated by molecular agents injected intravenously (NIRF) . No commercial systems based on intravascular fluorescence are currently on the market, however, significant steps forwards in intravascular fluorescence imaging technology have been made between 2010-2016. It is typically used to detect functional state of artery wall including some known high-risk features of atherosclerosis (e.g., inflammation). It is usually combined with structural imaging modalities such as Intravascular ultrasound and/or Intracoronary optical coherence tomography, to provide functional information in a morphological context.

== Methods ==
Intravascular fluorescence typically used laser-induced fluorescence to stimulate fluorescence emission of particular vessel wall and plaque components or previously injected molecular agents (i.e., molecular imaging). Fluorescence detection can be obtained by integration over a short period of time of the emitted intensity, life-time (i.e., fluorescence-lifetime imaging microscopy or FLIM), or by analyzing the spectral shape of emitted fluorescence (fluorescence spectroscopy). Near-infrared light is often used to stimulate fluorescence emission in the case of intravascular applications. Imaging catheters contain an optical fiber to deliver and collect light to and from inner lumen of human body through semi-invasive interventions (e.g., percutaneous coronary intervention in case of coronary arteries).

== Applications ==
Several research studies demonstrated the role of intravascular fluorescence for the diagnosis of vascular diseases. Plaque autofluorescence has been used in a first-in-man study in coronary arteries in combination with Intracoronary optical coherence tomography (OCT). Similarly, intravascular laser-induced fluorescence has been used in combination with OCT in a clinical study using an FDA approved molecular target (i.e., indocyanine green) to detect high-risk features of carotid plaques at risk for stroke. Molecular agents has been also used to detect specific features, such as stent fibrin accumulation to detect unhealed intravascular stent in vivo at increased risk of thrombosis and enzymatic activity related to artery inflammation.

== See also ==
- Intracoronary Optical Coherence Tomography
