= Philip Greenland =

Cardiologist and cardiovascular epidemiologist

- Education: Williams College (BA); University of Rochester (MD)
- Known for: Research on cardiovascular risk factors and coronary artery calcium scoring
- Awards: David E. Rogers Award (2016); James D. Bruce Memorial Award (2017); Arthur S. Agatston Cardiovascular Disease Prevention Award (2021)
- Scientific career
- Fields: Cardiology, epidemiology, preventive medicine
- Workplaces: University of Rochester Medical Center; Northwestern University Feinberg School of Medicine

Philip Greenland is a physician and cardiovascular epidemiologist whose research concerns the prevention of cardiovascular disease and the assessment of coronary artery disease risk. He is the Harry W. Dingman Professor of Cardiology and a professor of preventive medicine and medicine at the Northwestern University Feinberg School of Medicine. Greenland served as editor of Archives of Internal Medicine from 2004 through 2008. His research has examined sex differences in outcomes after myocardial infarction, the prevalence of cardiovascular risk factors before coronary events, and the use of coronary artery calcium measurements to refine cardiovascular risk prediction.

Greenland was on the faculty of the University of Rochester before moving to Northwestern in 1991, where he chaired the Department of Preventive Medicine until 2005. He received the Association of American Medical Colleges' David E. Rogers Award in 2016 and the American College of Physicians' James D. Bruce Memorial Award in 2017. He is an elected member of the Association of American Physicians and an honorary fellow of the Royal College of Physicians of London.

== Early life and education ==
Greenland grew up in Cincinnati, Ohio. He has said that the family physician who treated him during a childhood illness was his model of a doctor, and that he began considering a medical career in high school.

Greenland earned a bachelor's degree in chemistry from Williams College in 1970 and a medical degree from the University of Rochester in 1974. He completed an internal medicine internship and residency at Strong Memorial Hospital and a cardiology fellowship at the University of Minnesota in 1980. Greenland has said that his interest in prevention took shape during the fellowship, when he treated cardiac patients at a Veterans Administration hospital in whom he could identify contributing factors such as excess weight, poor eating habits and smoking.

== Career ==
Greenland joined the University of Rochester faculty in 1980. There he became an associate professor, ran a lipid clinic and a research program in preventive cardiology, and was medical director of a preventive cardiology and cardiac rehabilitation program. In 1989 he took a sabbatical year in Israel as a visiting professor of cardiology at Tel Aviv University's Sackler School of Medicine and the Heart Institute of the Chaim Sheba Medical Center, returning to Rochester in 1990.

In November 1991, Greenland moved to Northwestern University as professor and chair of the Department of Preventive Medicine. The post had been filled on an acting basis since the department's founding chair, Jeremiah Stamler, stepped down in 1987. Under Greenland, the department, previously the Department of Community Health and Preventive Medicine, was renamed the Department of Preventive Medicine.

In 2005, Greenland stepped down as department chair to become executive associate dean for clinical and translational research at Feinberg. He subsequently became the founding director of the Northwestern University Clinical and Translational Sciences Institute, launched in 2007, and relinquished the directorship in 2012.

Greenland was appointed editor of Archives of Internal Medicine, a journal of the American Medical Association, effective January 2004, succeeding James E. Dalen. He served until the end of 2008, when Rita Redberg succeeded him. He later served as a senior editor of JAMA.

== Research ==
=== Cardiovascular risk factors ===
Greenland has studied the relationship between established cardiovascular risk factors and subsequent coronary events. In a 2003 study published in JAMA, Greenland and colleagues analyzed three long-term cohorts, including participants in the Framingham Heart Study. Across the study groups, 87% to 100% of participants who died of coronary heart disease had previously been exposed to at least one major risk factor, such as smoking, diabetes, elevated blood pressure, or elevated cholesterol. The authors concluded that prior exposure to established coronary heart disease risk factors was common among patients who subsequently experienced coronary events.

In an accompanying JAMA editorial, cardiologists John G. Canto and Ami E. Iskandrian discussed the findings in relation to the frequently repeated claim that conventional cardiovascular risk factors were present in only about half of patients who developed coronary heart disease.

The interpretation of the 2003 study was subsequently discussed in correspondence published in JAMA. Martin Root and Fred Cobb noted that conventional risk factors were also prevalent among people who did not die of coronary heart disease, limiting the specificity of these factors for predicting events. Greenland replied that the study had sought to establish how frequently major risk factors preceded coronary events, rather than to demonstrate that their presence alone predicted an event.

In 2025, Greenland co-authored a study in the Journal of the American College of Cardiology examining the prevalence of nonoptimal cardiovascular risk factors before a first cardiovascular event. Using data from the Korean National Health Insurance Service and the Multi-Ethnic Study of Atherosclerosis (MESA), the researchers found that more than 99% of participants who subsequently experienced a first cardiovascular event had at least one traditional risk factor above the study's defined optimal level. These nonoptimal levels did not necessarily meet clinical thresholds for diagnosis or treatment. An accompanying editorial by Neha J. Pagidipati discussed the findings in relation to opportunities for earlier cardiovascular disease prevention.

=== Heart disease in women ===
During his sabbatical in Israel, Greenland worked with Israeli researchers on outcomes after myocardial infarction, focusing on women. In 1991, he and his colleagues published an analysis of 5,839 patients admitted with a myocardial infarction to coronary care units in Israel. After adjustment for age, in-hospital mortality was higher among women than men in the cohort (23.1% versus 15.7%), as was mortality during the year after discharge among those who survived hospitalization (11.8% versus 9.3%).

The findings were subsequently discussed in independent research on sex differences in myocardial infarction outcomes. In a 1998 JAMA study, Jaume Marrugat and colleagues compared mortality outcomes in a Spanish patient registry with earlier investigations, including Greenland's 1991 study. They reported that the six-month mortality rate in their study was similar to the one-year mortality rate reported by Greenland and colleagues, while noting differences in study designs and follow-up periods across the literature.

The Association of American Medical Colleges subsequently identified Greenland's research on sex differences in outcomes following myocardial infarction among his contributions to preventive cardiology.

=== Coronary artery calcium and risk assessment ===
Greenland has also studied coronary artery calcium scoring, which uses computed tomography to assess calcification in the coronary arteries as a marker of atherosclerosis. In a 2010 JAMA analysis of MESA participants, Tamar Polonsky, Greenland, and colleagues reported that adding calcium scores to conventional risk factors improved the classification of participants' estimated risk of coronary heart disease.

In an accompanying editorial, John Ioannidis and Ioanna Tzoulaki examined the evidence for coronary calcium scoring as a predictive test, considering how improved prediction should be evaluated in relation to clinical decision-making and patient outcomes.

Greenland chaired the writing committee for the 2010 American College of Cardiology Foundation–American Heart Association guideline on cardiovascular risk assessment in asymptomatic adults. The guideline identified a potential role for calcium scoring in selected people at intermediate risk while advising against its use for cardiovascular risk assessment in low-risk asymptomatic people. It also noted that evidence was insufficient to establish whether risk assessment with calcium scoring improved clinical outcomes.

Greenland and colleagues subsequently reviewed the evidence for coronary calcium scoring and its use in preventive decision-making in a 2018 article in the Journal of the American College of Cardiology.

== Recognition ==
Greenland received the Association of American Medical Colleges' David E. Rogers Award in 2016 for contributions to public health and health care. In 2017, the American College of Physicians awarded him its James D. Bruce Memorial Award for Distinguished Contributions in Preventive Medicine.

In 2021, the Society of Cardiovascular Computed Tomography presented Greenland with its Arthur S. Agatston Cardiovascular Disease Prevention Award, citing his research on the use of coronary calcium scoring in cardiovascular risk prediction.

Greenland is a fellow of the American College of Physicians, the American Heart Association, the American College of Cardiology, the European Society of Cardiology, and the Society of Cardiovascular Computed Tomography.

== Personal life ==
Greenland is married to Aviva Greenland; they have four children. In 2017, the couple received the Eitz Chaim Award from Congregation Or Torah, a synagogue in Skokie, Illinois.
