= Endoscopic optical coherence tomography imaging =

History, technology, medical applications and recent developments of intravascular OCT

Endoscopic optical coherence tomography
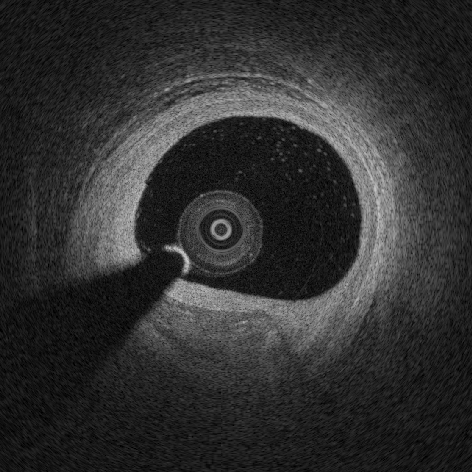
- Example of intracoronary optical coherence tomography (OCT) image of atherosclerosis. Between 6 and 8 o'clock it is possible to observe a fibrocalcific atherosclerotic plaque.

Endoscopic optical coherence tomography, also intravascular optical coherence tomography is a catheter-based imaging application of optical coherence tomography (OCT). It is capable of acquiring high-resolution images from inside a blood vessel using optical fibers and laser technology.

One of its main applications is for coronary arteries, which are often treated by endoscopic, minimally invasive surgical procedures. Other applications for peripheral arteries and for neurovascular procedures have been proposed and are being investigated. Neurovascular applications required significant technological developments, due to the highly tortuous anatomy of the cerebrovasculature.

Intravascular OCT rapidly creates three-dimensional images at a resolution of approximately 15 micrometers, an improved resolution with respect to intravascular ultrasound and coronary angiogram, the other imaging techniques. This offers additional information that can be used to optimize the treatment and management of vascular disease.

== Theory ==
OCT is analogous to medical ultrasound, measuring the backreflection of infrared light rather than sound. The time for light to be reflected back from the tissue under inspection is used to measure distances. However, due to the high speed of light, the backreflection time cannot be measured directly, but is instead measured using interferometry.

OCT is measured using either time domain (TD-OCT) or frequency domain techniques (FD-OCT). Commercially available coronary OCT technology is based on frequency domain techniques, resulting in rapid acquisition procedures (1 to 2 seconds). Intracoronary OCT uses near-infrared light at 1300 nm and can visualize the microstructure of the arterial wall, its size, and therapeutic devices with high accuracy.

== History ==
Intravascular OCT was developed for the imaging of arterial disease at a resolution higher than the other techniques available, such as x-ray angiography and intravascular ultrasounds. OCT allows to assess atherosclerotic plaques characteristics at a resolution of approximately 15 μm (or better) and found applications for the guidance of catheter-based coronary interventions (ie, percutaneous coronary interventions). The first report of endoscopic OCT appeared in 1997 in the journal Science exploring various applications including gastroenterology and airways. The first intravascular in vivo use in a preclinical model was reported in 1994 and first in human, clinical imaging in 2003. The first OCT imaging catheter and system was commercialized by LightLab Imaging, Inc., a company based in Massachusetts formed following a technology transfer in 1997 from Fujimoto's lab (MIT).

Early on, time-domain OCT technology required slow acquisitions (>10 seconds long) requiring the use of balloon occlusion techniques to displace the blood from the arterial lumen, opaque to near-infrared light. This prevented a broader adoption for several years. Aroun 2008-2009, the advent of rapid sweep source lasers allowed for the development of intravascular Fourier-Domain OCT (FD-OCT). This enabled for the first-time rapid acquisitions of a long coronary segment in a couple of seconds, allowing non occlusive brief contrast injections to clear the arterial lumen from blood. Initial demonstration of FD-OCT for coronary imaging was achieved in 2008-2009 which significantly accelerated clinical adoption starting in 2009.

== Cardiovascular applications ==
Following regulatory clearances in the major geographies between 2009 and 2012 of fast acquisition Fourier domain OCT, the use of intracoronary OCT rapidly increased. It is used to help coronary disease diagnosis, planning of the intervention, assess procedural results, and prevent complications.

In the last decade, clinical benefits of coronary OCT have been systematically investigated. Several studies have linked the use of intravascular imaging such as IVUS and OCT to better stent expansion, a metric strongly correlated to better clinical outcomes in patients suffering from coronary artery disease and myocardial infarction.

Larger randomized clinical trials have been undertaken. In 2023, a double-blind prospective trial demonstrated improvement in morbidity and mortality in coronary bifurcation interventions: "Among patients with complex coronary-artery bifurcation lesions, OCT-guided PCI was associated with a lower incidence of MACE at 2 years than angiography-guided PCI." Although not every study showed significant results, to date, several studies demonstrated the benefits in patient outcomes of using intravascular imaging during coronary arteries interventions. The use of intravascular imaging for coronary intervention is reported on the current cardiology guidelines.

Data published in late 2016 showed that over 150,000 intracoronary optical coherence tomography procedures are performed every year, and its adoption is rapidly growing at a rate of ~10-20% every year.

Assessment of artery lumen morphology is the cornerstone of intravascular imaging criteria to evaluate disease severity and guide intervention. The high-resolution of OCT imaging allows to assess with high accuracy vessel lumen area, wall microstructure, intracoronary stent apposition and expansion. OCT has an improved ability with respect to intravascular ultrasound to penetrate and delineate calcium in the vessel wall that makes it well suited to guide complex interventional strategies in vessels with superficial calcification. OCT has the capability of visualize coronary plaque erosion and fibrotic caps overlying lipid plaques.

== Neurovascular applications ==
In the last decade, significant advances have been made in the endovascular treatment of stroke, including brain aneurysms, intracranial atherosclerosis and ischemic stroke. Intravascular OCT has been proposed has a key technology that can improve current procedure and treatments. However, current intracoronary OCT catheters are not designed for navigation and reliable imaging of tortuous cerebrovascular arteries.

Recently, different (wire-like) OCT catheters have been proposed and were specifically designed for the human cerebrovasculature, named neuro optical coherence tomography (nOCT). A first clinical study to investigate safety, feasibility, and clinical potential has been conducted. Initial applications for the treatment of brain aneurysms and intracranial atherosclerosis have been demonstrated showing future potential.

== Technology ==
The most critical technological advance was the catheter and the development of fast wavelength sweeping near-infrared lasers. The fiber optic catheter/endoscope required rapid alignment of two optical fibers with 8 μm cores (one rotating) across free space. The distal end has a focusing component (GRIN or ball lens, typically).

State-of-the-art intracoronary optical coherence tomography uses a swept-source laser to make OCT images at high-speed (i.e., approximately 80,000 kHz - A-scan lines per second) to complete acquisition of a 3D OCT volume of coronary segments in a few-seconds. The first intravascular FD-OCT was introduced to the market in 2009 (EU and Asia) and in 2012 (US). In 2018, two intracoronary OCT catheters are clinically available for use in the coronary arteries, having a size in diameter between 2.4F and 2.7F.

The axial resolution of state-of-the-art commercial systems is less than 20 micrometers, which is decoupled from the catheter lateral resolution. The highest resolution of OCT allows for the in vivo imaging of vessel microstructural features at an unprecedented level, enabling visualization of vessel wall atherosclerosis, pathology, and interaction with therapeutic devices at a microscopic level.

Recent developments included the combination of OCT with spectroscopy and fluorescence in a single imaging catheter and miniaturization of the imaging catheter.

== Safety ==
Safety of intravascular imaging, including intracoronary OCT and intravascular ultrasound, has been investigated by several studies. Recent clinical trials reported a very low rate of self-limiting, minor complications on over 3,000 patients where in all cases no harm or prolongation of hospital stay was observed. Intracoronary optical coherence tomography was demonstrated to be safe among heterogeneous groups of patients presenting varying clinical setting.

== See also ==
- Fractional flow reserve
- Intravascular fluorescence
