= Capacitive micromachined ultrasonic transducer =

Electronics component

Capacitive micromachined ultrasonic transducers (CMUT) are a relatively new concept in the field of ultrasonic transducers. Most of the commercial ultrasonic transducers today are based on piezoelectricity. In CMUTs, the energy transduction is due to change in capacitance. CMUTs are constructed on silicon using micromachining techniques. A cavity is formed in a silicon substrate, and a thin layer suspended on the top of the cavity serves as a membrane on which a metallized layer acts an electrode, together with the silicon substrate which serves as a bottom electrode.

If an AC signal is applied across the biased electrodes, the vibrating membrane will produce ultrasonic waves in the medium of interest. In this way it works as a transmitter. On the other hand, if ultrasonic waves are applied on the membrane of a biased CMUT, it will generate alternating signal as the capacitance of the CMUT is varied. In this way, it works as a receiver of ultrasonic waves.

As CMUTs are micromachined devices, it is easier to construct 2D arrays of transducers using this technology. This means large numbers of CMUTs could be included in a transducer array providing larger bandwidth compared to other transducer technologies. To achieve a high frequency operation using CMUTs is easier due to its smaller dimensions. The frequency of operation depends on the cell size (cavity of membrane), and on the stiffness of the material used as a membrane. As it is built on silicon, the integration of electronics would be easier for the CMUTs compared to other transducer technologies. The properties to use in high frequency with large bandwidth makes it a good choice to use as a transducer in medical imaging, especially in an intravascular ultrasound (IVUS). Because of its broader bandwidth, it could be used in second-harmonic imaging. Also some experiments have been performed to use CMUTs as hydrophones.

== Fabrication methods ==
=== Sacrificial release surface micromachining ===
Surface micromachining is the traditional way of manufacturing CMUTs. The major limitations of this method include complicated manufacturing process for constructing and sealing etch/drainage channels of the sacrificial material; the need for sacrificial-release channels reduces the available space for transducers, thereby reducing the achievable sound generation capability; limited control of layers' thickness during the manufacturing process; limited cavity thickness due to residues of fluid inside the cell cavity, which can cause stiction between the upper and lower parts of the cell, if the cell is not thick enough.

=== Wafer bonding ===
Wafer bonding is the most popular method. In this method, a CMUT is built from two separate wafers, which are later bonded to achieve cells with cavities.

==== Fusion-bonding ====
Fusion-bonding of wafers.

Multi-user MUMPS (polyMUMPS) process. CMUTs manufactured in the multi-user MUMPS were reported to have reduced performance, such as relatively low resonating frequency.

==== Anodic bonding ====
In anodic bonding, wafers are sealed at high temperature and in the presence of electric field.

=== Top-down process ===
In this method the manufacturing is performed in reverse order, compared to the traditional way. The structural membrane is in silicon-nitride LPCVD, but the entire process is low-temperature, so it is CMOS-compatible. There are no etch-hole on the radiating surface of the device. The connection pads are on the back of the device, without using of through VIAs in the silicon, and the silicon substrate is completely removed. A custom acoustic backing is used to improve acoustic performances of the device. The process uses few masks (7–8).

=== Integration with electrical circuits ===
As mentioned earlier, one of the significant advantages of CMUTs over piezoelectric transducers is the ability to integrate CMUTs with electrical circuits, using existing manufacturing methods.

== Benchmarking ==
CMUT performance is benchmarked using pitch-catch and pulse-echo experiments, and operation uniformity is tested in air and in immersion. In a pitch-catch experiment, the transducer is benchmarked using a hydrophone, and in a pulse-echo experiment, the transducer is used both for transmitting and receiving, while comparing the measured signal to the hydrophone response.

== Applications ==
The CMUT-on-CMOS technology and the flip-chip process allows tight integration of CMUTs with front-end electronics, which is necessary for miniature medical imaging devices, such as IVUS.

== See also ==
- PMUT, a similar technology based on piezoelectricity
