= Piezoelectric micromachined ultrasonic transducer =

MEMS-based piezoelectric ultrasonic transducers

Piezoelectric micromachined ultrasonic transducers (PMUT) are MEMS-based piezoelectric ultrasonic transducers. Unlike bulk piezoelectric transducers which use the thickness-mode motion of a plate of piezoelectric ceramic such as PZT or single-crystal PMN-PT, PMUT are based on the flexural motion of a thin membrane coupled with a thin piezoelectric film, such as PVDF.

In comparison with bulk piezoelectric ultrasound transducers, PMUT can offer advantages such as increased bandwidth, flexible geometries, natural acoustic impedance match with water, reduced voltage requirements, mixing of different resonant frequencies and potential for integration with supporting electronic circuits especially for miniaturized high frequency applications.

== See also ==
- CMUT, a similar technology based on capacitance
