= Fractional flow reserve =

Pressure after a stenosis relative to pressure before

Fractional flow reserve (FFR) is a diagnostic technique used in coronary catheterization. FFR measures pressure differences across a coronary artery stenosis (narrowing, usually due to atherosclerosis) to determine the likelihood that the stenosis impedes oxygen delivery to the heart muscle (myocardial ischemia).

Fractional flow reserve is defined as the pressure after (distal to) a stenosis relative to the pressure before the stenosis. The result is an absolute number; an FFR of 0.80 means that a given stenosis causes a 20% drop in blood pressure. In other words, FFR expresses the maximal flow down a vessel in the presence of a stenosis compared to the maximal flow in the hypothetical absence of the stenosis.

== Procedure ==
During coronary catheterization, a catheter is inserted into the femoral (groin) or radial arteries (wrist) using a sheath and guidewire. FFR uses a small sensor on the tip of the wire (commonly a transducer) to measure pressure, temperature and flow to determine the exact severity of the lesion. This is done during maximal blood flow (hyperemia), which can be induced by injecting products such as adenosine or papaverine. A pullback of the pressure wire is performed, and pressures are recorded across the vessel.

When interpreting FFR measurements, higher values indicate a non-significant stenosis, whereas lower values indicate a significant lesion. There is no absolute cut-off point at which an FFR measurement is considered abnormal. However, reviews of clinical trials show a cut-off range between 0.75 and 0.80 has been used when determining significance.

== Equation ==
Fractional flow reserve (FFR) is the ratio of maximum blood flow distal to a stenotic lesion to normal maximum flow in the same vessel. It is calculated using the pressure ratio

$FFR = \frac{p_d}{p_a}$

where $p_d$ is the pressure distal to the lesion, and $p_a$ is the pressure proximal to the lesion.

== Rationale ==
The decision to perform a percutaneous coronary intervention (PCI) is usually based on angiographic results alone. Angiography can be used for visual evaluation of the inner diameter of a vessel. In ischemic heart disease, deciding which narrowing is the culprit lesion is not always clear-cut. Fractional flow reserve can provide a functional evaluation by measuring the pressure decline caused by a vessel narrowing.

=== Advantages and disadvantages ===
FFR has certain advantages over other techniques to evaluate narrowed coronary arteries, such as coronary angiography, intravascular ultrasound or CT coronary angiography. For example, FFR takes into account collateral flow, which can render an anatomical blockage functionally unimportant. Also, standard angiography can underestimate or overestimate narrowing, because it only visualizes contrast inside a vessel. Finally, when compared to other indices of vessel narrowing, FFR seems to be less vulnerable to variability between patients.

Other techniques can also provide information which FFR cannot. Intravascular ultrasound, for example, can provide information on plaque vulnerability, whereas FFR measures are only determined by plaque thickness. There are newly developed technologies that can assess both plaque vulnerability and FFR from CT by measuring the vasodilatory capacity of the arterial wall.

FFR allows real-time estimation of the effects of a narrowed vessel, and allows for simultaneous treatment with balloon dilatation and stenting. On the other hand, FFR is an invasive procedure for which non-invasive (less drastic) alternatives exist, such as cardiac stress testing. In this test, physical exercise or intravenous medication (adenosine/dobutamine) is used to increase the workload and oxygen demand of the heart muscle, and ischemia is detected using ECG changes or nuclear imaging.

=== DEFER study ===
In the DEFER study, fractional flow reserve was used to determine the need for stenting in patients with intermediate single vessel disease. In stenosis patients with an FFR of less than 0.75, outcomes were significantly worse. In patients with an FFR of 0.75 or more however, stenting did not influence outcomes.

=== FAME study ===
The Fractional Flow Reserve versus Angiography for Multivessel Evaluation (FAME) study evaluated the role of FFR in patients with multivessel coronary artery disease. In 20 centers in Europe and the United States, 1005 patients undergoing percutaneous coronary intervention with drug eluting stent implantation were randomized to intervention based on angiography or based on fractional flow reserve in addition to angiography. In the angiography arm of the study, all suspicious-looking lesions were stented. In the FFR arm, only angiographically suspicious lesions with an FFR of 0.80 or less were stented.

In the patients whose care was guided by FFR, fewer stents were used (2.7±1.2 and 1.9±1.3, respectively). After one year, the primary endpoint of death, nonfatal myocardial infarction, and repeat revascularization were lower in the FFR group (13.2% versus 18.3%), largely attributable to fewer stenting procedures and their associated complications. There also was a non-significantly higher number of patients with residual angina (81% versus 78%). In the FFR group, hospital stay was slightly shorter (3.4 vs 3.7 days) and procedural costs were less ($5,332 vs $6,007). FFR did not prolong procedure (around 70 minutes in both groups).
