= Intravascular ultrasound =

Type of medical imaging methodology

- ICD-9-CM: 00.2
- OPS-301 code: 3-05e
- MedlinePlus: 007266

Intravascular ultrasound (IVUS) or intravascular echocardiography is a medical imaging methodology using a specially designed catheter with a miniaturized ultrasound probe attached to the distal end of the catheter. The proximal end of the catheter is attached to computerized ultrasound equipment. It allows the application of ultrasound technology, such as piezoelectric transducer or CMUT, to see from inside blood vessels out through the surrounding blood column, visualizing the endothelium (inner wall) of blood vessels.

The arteries of the heart (the coronary arteries) are the most frequent imaging target for IVUS. IVUS is used in the coronary arteries to determine the amount of atheromatous plaque built up at any particular point in the epicardial coronary artery. Intravascular ultrasound provides a unique method to study the regression or progression of atherosclerotic lesions in vivo. The progressive accumulation of plaque within the artery wall over decades leads to the development of unstable vulnerable plaque which can detach as clots leading to strokes and heart attacks. IVUS is of use to determine both plaque volume within the wall of the artery and/or the degree of stenosis of the artery lumen. It can be especially useful in situations in which angiographic imaging is considered unreliable; such as for the lumen of ostial lesions or where angiographic images do not visualize lumen segments adequately, such as regions with multiple overlapping arterial segments. It is also used to assess the effects of treatments of stenosis such as with hydraulic angioplasty expansion of the artery, with or without stents, and the results of medical therapy over time.

== Advantages over angiography ==
Arguably the most valuable use of IVUS is to visualize plaque, which cannot be seen by angiography. Over time this technique has evolved into an extremely useful research tool for modern invasive cardiology, and it has been increasingly used in research to better understand the behavior of the atherosclerosis process in living people.

IVUS enables accurately visualizing not only the lumen of the coronary arteries but also the atheroma (membrane/cholesterol loaded white blood cells) "hidden" within the wall. IVUS has thus enabled advances in clinical research providing a more thorough perspective and better understanding.

In the early 1990s, IVUS research on the re-stenosis problem after angioplasty lead to recognition that most of the re-stenosis problem (as visualized by an angiography examination) was not true re-stenosis. Instead it was simply a remodeling of the atheromatous plaque, which was still protruding into the lumen of the artery after completion of angioplasty; the stenosis only appearing to be reduced because blood and contrast could now flow around and through some of the plaque. The angiographic dye column appeared widened adequately; yet considerable plaque was within the newly widened lumen and the lumen remained partially obstructed. This recognition promoted more frequent use of stents to hold the plaque outward against the inner artery walls, out of the lumen.

Additionally, IVUS examinations, as they were done more frequently, served to reveal and confirm the autopsy research findings of the late 1980s, showing that atheromatous plaque tends to cause expansion of the internal elastic lamina, causing the degree of plaque burden to be greatly underestimated by angiography. Angiography only reveals the edge of the atheroma that protrudes into the lumen.

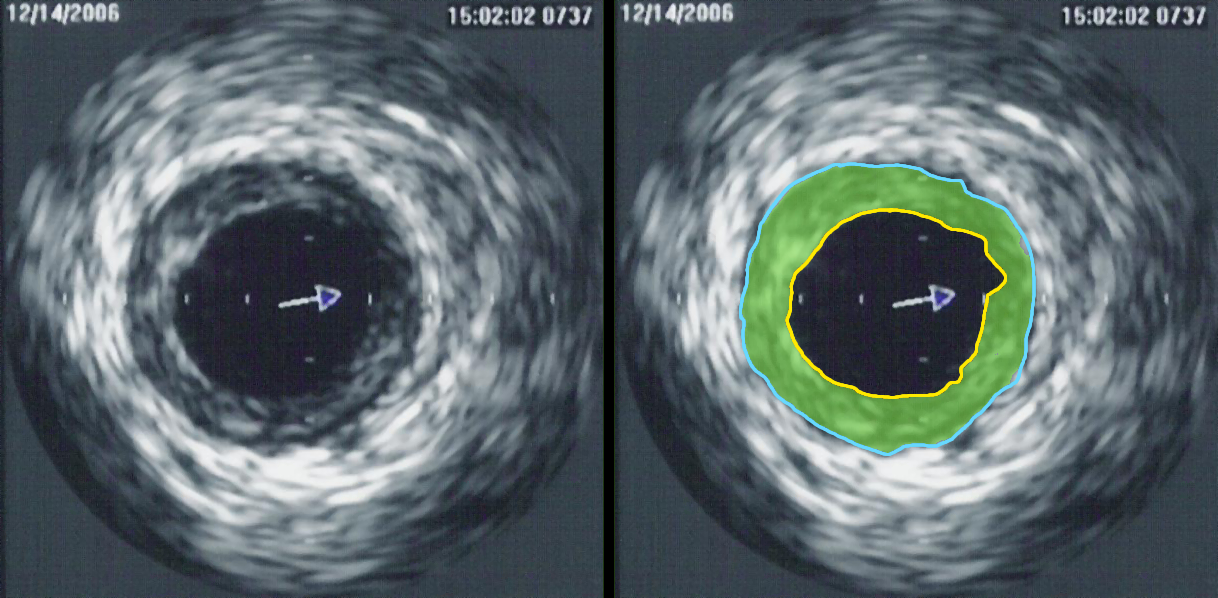
Intravascular ultrasound image of a coronary artery (left), with color-coding on the right, delineating the lumen (yellow), external elastic membrane (blue) and the atherosclerotic plaque burden (green). The percentage stenosis is defined as the area of the lumen (yellow) divided by the area of the external elastic membrane (blue) times 100. As the plaque burden increases, the lumen size will decrease and the degree of stenosis will increase.

Perhaps the greatest contribution to understanding, so far, was achieved by clinical research trials completed in the United States in the late 1990s, using combined angiography and IVUS examination, to study which coronary lesions most commonly result in a myocardial infarction. The studies revealed that most myocardial infarctions occur at areas with extensive atheroma within the artery wall, however very little stenosis of the artery opening. The range of lumen stenosis locations at which myocardial infarctions occurred ranged from areas of mild dilation all the way to areas of greater than 95% stenosis. However the average or typical stenosis at which myocardial infarctions occurred were found to be less than 50%, describing plaques long considered insignificant by many. Only 14% of heart attacks occurred at locations with 75% or more stenosis, the severe stenoses previously thought by many to present the greatest danger to the individual. This research has changed the primary focus for heart attack prevention from severe narrowing to vulnerable plaque.

Current clinical uses of IVUS technology include checking how to treat complex lesions before angioplasty and checking how well an intracoronary stent has been deployed within a coronary artery after angioplasty. If a stent is not expanded flush against the wall of the vessel, turbulent flow may occur between the stent and the wall of the vessel; some fear this might create a nidus for acute thrombosis of the artery.

== Disadvantages versus angiography ==
The primary disadvantages of IVUS being used routinely in a cardiac catheterization laboratory are its expense, the increase in the time of the procedure, and the fact that it is considered an interventional procedure, and should only be performed by angiographers that are trained in interventional cardiology techniques. In addition, there may be additional risk imposed by the use of the IVUS catheter.

The computerized IVUS echocardiographic imaging systems list for $120,000, US, 2007 for a cart based system and ~$70,000 for an installed or integrated solution. The disposable catheters used to do each examination typically cost ~$600, US, 2007. In many hospitals, the IVUS system is placed as part of a bundle deal based on minimum disposable sales volumes. In other words, the cost of the console is paid for by rebates from other purchased products including IVUS catheters. Because no standard exists, IVUS catheters cannot be interchanged between different manufacturers.

Additionally, IVUS adds significant additional examination time and some increased risk to the patient beyond performing a standard diagnostic angiographic examination. This increase is significantly less when IVUS is part of a percutaneous coronary intervention, since much of the setup is the same for the intervention as for the IVUS imaging.

IVUS continues to improve and some manufacturers have proposed building IVUS technology into angioplasty and stent balloon catheters, a potential major advance, but limited by complexity, cost and increased bulk of the catheters.

== Comparison versus intravascular optical coherence tomography ==
Compared to IVUS, intravascular OCT offers an order of magnitude improved resolution for a better visualization of vessel lumen, tissue microstructure and devices (e.g., intracoronary stents). IVUS offers an improved imaging depth for the assessment of lipid or necrotic plaques, while intravascular OCT offers better penetration and enhanced imaging of calcific tissue. Intravascular OCT requires a short injection of contrast (e.g., 2 to 3 seconds) in a similar way to obtain an angiographic image. IVUS does not require a contrast injection as ultrasounds can penetrate through blood.

== Method ==
To visualize an artery or vein, angiographic techniques are used and the physician positions the tip of a guidewire, usually 0.36 mm (0.014") diameter with a very soft and pliable tip and about 200 cm long. The physician steers the guidewire from outside the body, through angiography catheters and into the blood vessel branch to be imaged.

The ultrasound catheter tip is slid in over the guidewire and positioned, using angiography techniques so that the tip is at the farthest away position to be imaged. The sound waves are emitted from the catheter tip, are usually in the 20-40 MHz range, and the catheter also receives and conducts the return echo information out to the external computerized ultrasound equipment which constructs and displays a real time ultrasound image of a thin section of the blood vessel currently surrounding the catheter tip, usually displayed at 30 frames/second image.

The guide wire is kept stationary and the ultrasound catheter tip is slid backwards, usually under motorized control at a pullback speed of 0.5 mm/s. (The motorized pullback tends to be smoother than hand movement by the physician.)

The (a) blood vessel wall inner lining, (b) atheromatous disease within the wall and (c) connective tissues covering the outer surface of the blood vessel are echogenic, i.e. they return echoes making them visible on the ultrasound display.

By contrast, the blood itself and the healthy muscular tissue portion of the blood vessel wall is relatively echolucent, just black circular spaces, in the images.

Heavy calcium deposits in the blood vessel wall both heavily reflect sound, i.e. are very echogenic, but are also distinguishable by shadowing. Heavy calcification blocks sound transmission beyond and so, in the echo images, are seen as both very bright areas but with black shadows behind (from the vantage point of the catheter tip emitting the ultrasound waves).

== Uses ==
IVUS demonstrated the anatomy of the artery wall in living animals and humans. It has improved understanding on both the behavior of the atherosclerosis process and the effects of different treatments.

=== Intravascular ultrasound in the coronary anatomy ===
An IVUS image of the ostial left main coronary artery (left). The blue outline delineates the cross-sectional area of the lumen of the artery (A1 in the upper right corner), measuring 6.0 mm^{2}. A two-dimensional mapping of the proximal LAD and left main coronary arteries is shown on the right.

While the routine use of IVUS during percutaneous coronary intervention does not improve short term outcomes, there are a number of situations in which IVUS is of particular use in the treatment of coronary artery disease of the heart. In particular in cases when the degree of stenosis of a coronary artery is unclear, IVUS can directly quantify the percentage of stenosis and give insight into the anatomy of the plaque.

One particular use of IVUS in the coronary anatomy is in the quantification of left main disease in cases where routine coronary angiography gives equivocal results. Many studies in the past have shown that significant left main disease can increase mortality, and that intervention (either coronary artery bypass graft surgery or percutaneous coronary intervention) to reduce mortality is necessary when the left main stenosis is significant.

When using IVUS to determine whether an individual's left main disease is clinically significant, in terms of the desirability of physical intervention, the two most widely used parameters are the degree of stenosis and the minimal lumen area. A cross sectional area of ≤7 mm² in a symptomatic individual or ≤6 mm² in an asymptomatic individual is considered to be clinically significant and warrants intervention to improve one-year mortality. However, these exact cutoffs are up for debate and different cutoff cross-sectional areas may be used in practice depending on differing interpretations of the trial data.

=== Validating the efficacy of new treatments ===
Because IVUS is widely available in coronary catheterization labs worldwide and can accurately quantify arterial plaque, especially within the coronary arteries, it is increasingly being used to evaluate newer and evolving strategies for the treatment of coronary artery disease, including the statins and other approaches.

== See also ==
- Fractional flow reserve
- Intracoronary Optical Coherence Tomography
