= Coronary arteries =

Arteries transporting blood to heart muscle

- Coronary arteries (labeled in red text) and other major landmarks (in blue text)

Identifiers
- FMA: 49893

The coronary arteries are the arterial blood vessels of coronary circulation, which transport oxygenated blood to the heart muscle. The heart requires a continuous supply of oxygen to function and survive, much like any other tissue or organ of the body.

The coronary arteries wrap around the entire heart. The two main branches are the left coronary artery and right coronary artery. The arteries can additionally be categorized based on the area of the heart for which they provide circulation. These categories are called epicardial (above the epicardium, or the outermost tissue of the heart) and microvascular (close to the endocardium, or the innermost tissue of the heart).

Reduced function of the coronary arteries can lead to decreased flow of oxygen and nutrients to the heart. Not only does this affect supply to the heart muscle itself, but it also can affect the ability of the heart to pump blood throughout the body. Therefore, any disorder or disease of the coronary arteries can have a serious impact on health, possibly leading to angina, a heart attack, and even death.

== Structure ==
The coronary arteries are mainly composed of the left and right coronary arteries, both of which give off several branches, as shown in the 'coronary artery flow' figure.

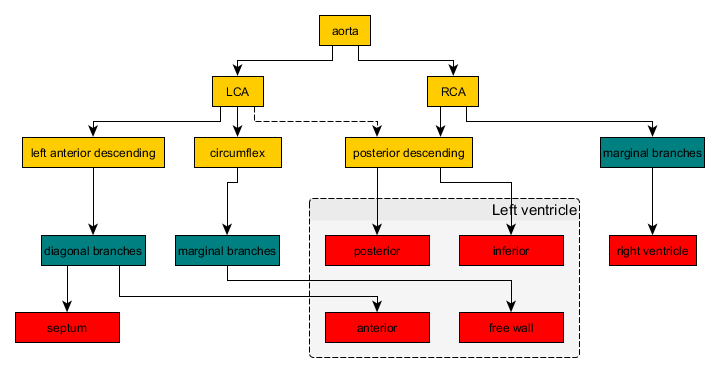
- Coronary artery flow
  Aorta
  - Left coronary artery
    - Left anterior descending artery
    - Left circumflex artery
    - Posterior descending artery
    - Ramus or intermediate artery
  - Right coronary artery
    - Right marginal artery
    - Posterior descending artery

The left coronary artery arises from the aorta within the left cusp of the aortic valve and feeds blood to the left side of the heart. It branches into two arteries, the left anterior descending and the left circumflex. The left anterior descending artery perfuses the interventricular septum and anterior wall of the left ventricle. The left circumflex artery perfuses the left ventricular free wall. In approximately 33% of individuals, the left coronary artery gives rise to the posterior descending artery which perfuses the posterior and inferior walls of the left ventricle. Sometimes a third branch is formed at the fork between left anterior descending and left circumflex arteries, known as a ramus or intermediate artery.

The right coronary artery (RCA) originates within the right cusp of the aortic valve. It travels down the right coronary sulcus, towards the crux of the heart. The RCA primarily branches into the right marginal arteries, and, in 67% of individuals, gives place to the posterior descending artery. The right marginal arteries perfuse the right ventricle and the posterior descending artery perfuses the left ventricular posterior and inferior walls.

There is also the conus artery, which is only present in about 45 percent of the human population, and which provides collateral blood flow to the heart when the left anterior descending artery is occluded.

== Clinical significance ==
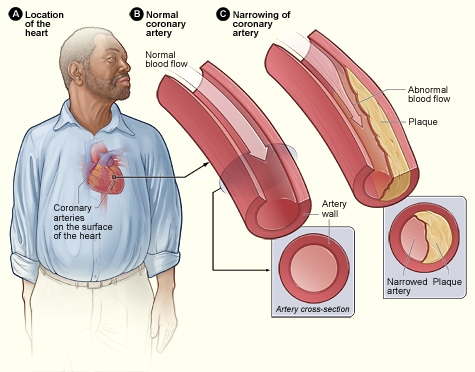
Atherosclerosis

Narrowing of the arteries can be caused by a process known as atherosclerosis (most common), arteriosclerosis, or arteriolosclerosis. This occurs when plaques (made up of deposits of cholesterol and other substances) build up over time in the walls of the arteries. Coronary artery disease (CAD) or ischemic heart disease are the terms used to describe narrowing of the coronary arteries.

As the disease progresses, plaque buildup can partially block blood flow to the heart muscle. Without enough blood supply (ischemia), the heart is unable to work properly, especially under increased stress. Stable angina is chest pain on exertion that improves with rest. Unstable angina is chest pain that can occur at rest, feels more severe, and/or last longer than stable angina. It is caused by more severe narrowing of the arteries.

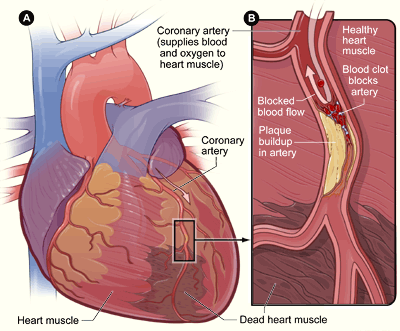
Heart attack

A heart attack results from a sudden plaque rupture and formation of a thrombus (blood clot) that completely blocks blood flow to a portion of the heart, leading to tissue death (infarct).

CAD can also result in heart failure or arrhythmias. Heart failure is caused by chronic oxygen deprivation due to reduced blood flow, which weakens the heart over time. Arrhythmias are caused by inadequate blood supply to the heart that interferes with the heart's electric impulse.

The coronary arteries can constrict as a response to various stimuli, mostly chemical. This is known as a coronary reflex.

There is also a rare condition known as spontaneous coronary artery dissection, in which the wall of one of the coronary arteries tears, causing severe pain. Unlike CAD, spontaneous coronary artery dissection is not due to plaque buildup in arteries, and tends to occur in younger individuals, including women who have recently given birth or men who do intense exercise.

Coronary artery dominance is described as the coronary artery that give branches to supply the right posterior descending artery and supplies the inferior wall of the heart. In 80 to 85% of the population, the right coronary artery supplies the posterior descending artery, making it right heart dominant while in 7 to 13% of the population, the left coronary artery supplies the posterior descending artery, making it left heart dominant. In 7 to 8% of the population, both right and left coronary arteries supplies the posterior descending artery, making it right and left co-dominance. Narrowing of coronary arteries is more frequent in those who are left dominant when compared to those who have right dominant or co-dominant hearts.

== Name etymology ==
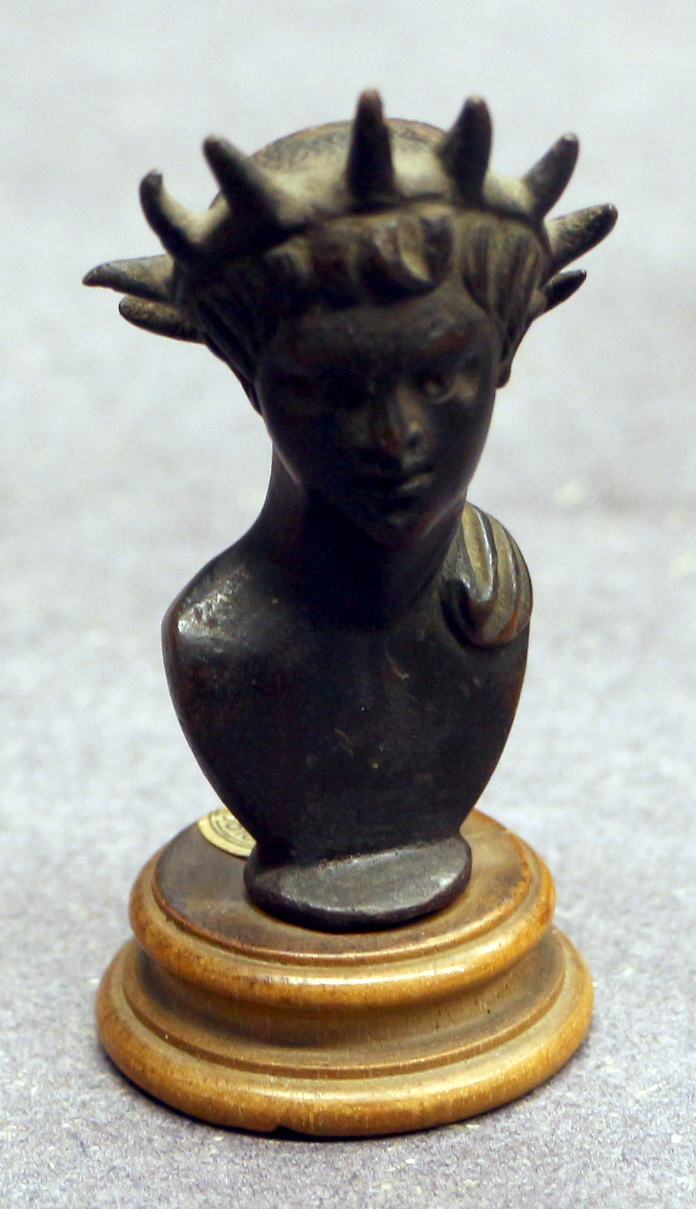
Radiant crown

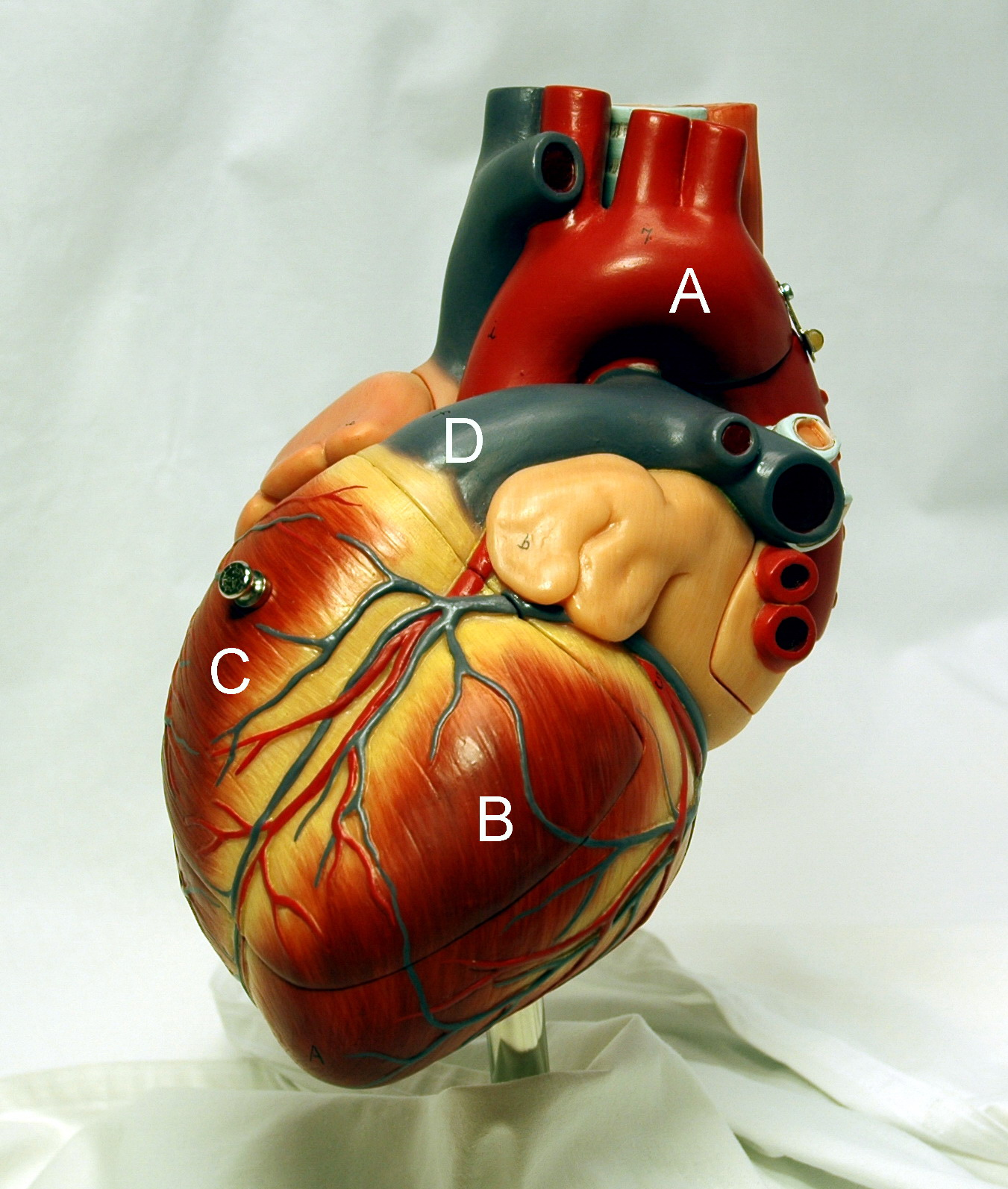
Model of human heart

The word corona is a Latin word that means "crown", from the Ancient Greek κορώνη (korōnè, "garland, wreath"). It was applied to the coronary arteries because of a notional resemblance (compare the photos).

The word arterie in Anglo-French (artaire in Old French, and artērium in Latin) means "windpipe" and "an artery". It was applied to the coronary arteries because the arteries do not contain blood after death.

== See also ==
- Coronary circulation
- Left coronary artery
- Right coronary artery
- Heart
- Cardiology
- Coronary artery disease
- Angina
- Unstable angina
- Heart attack
- Cardiac skeleton
- Coronary sinus
- Foramen ovale (heart)
- Patent foramen ovale

== Additional images ==
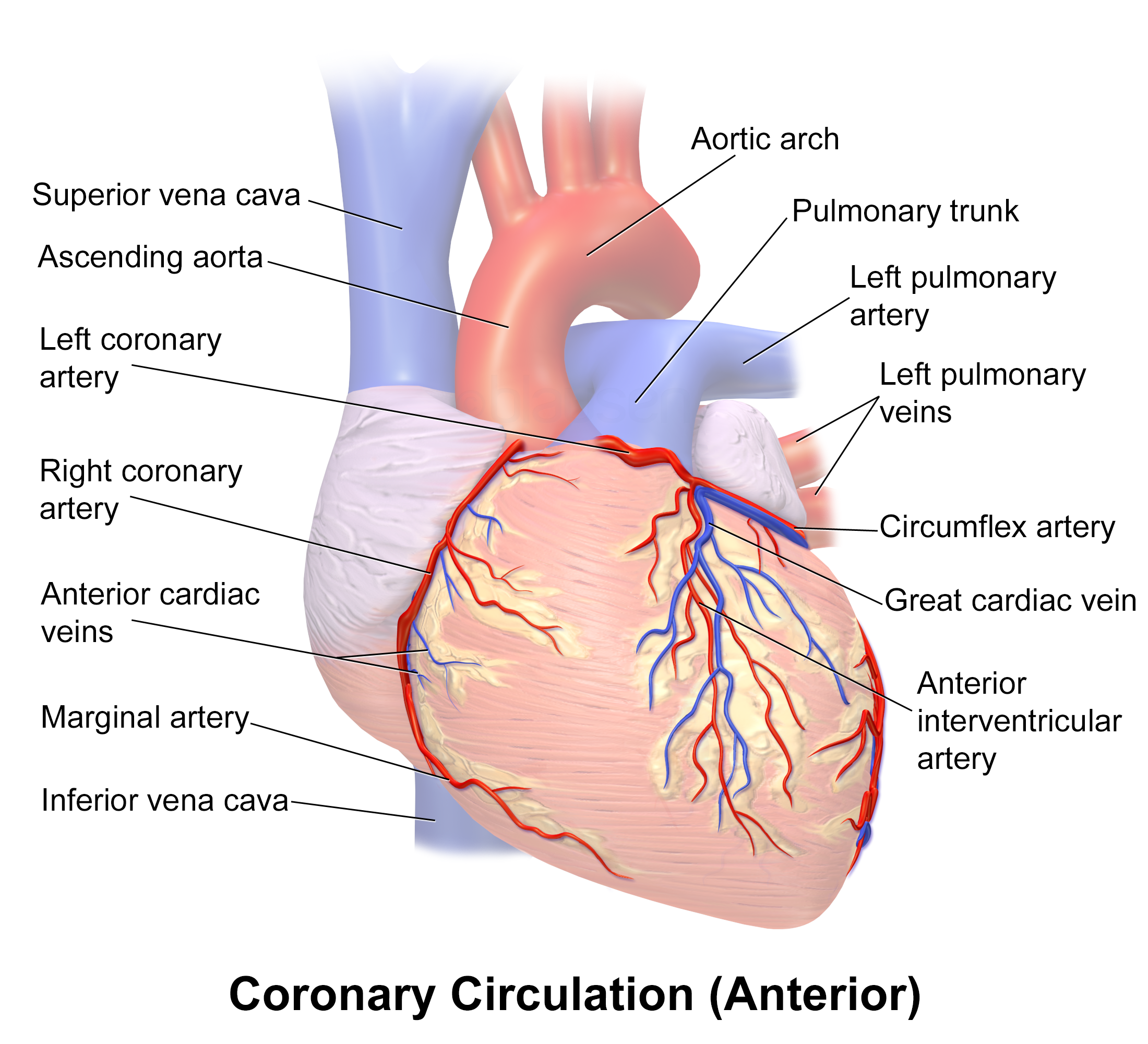

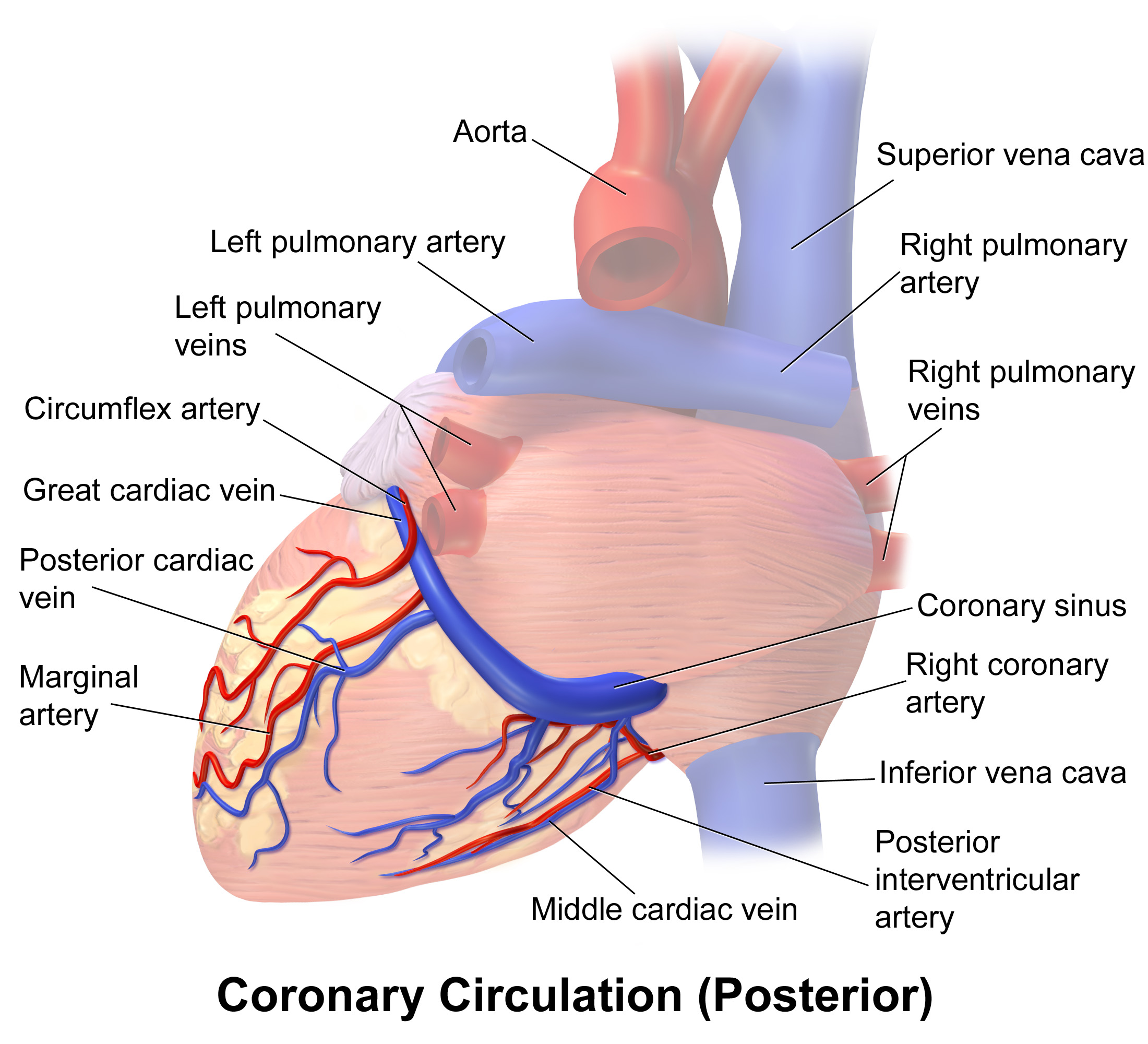
