= Anatomy of the human heart =

Heart
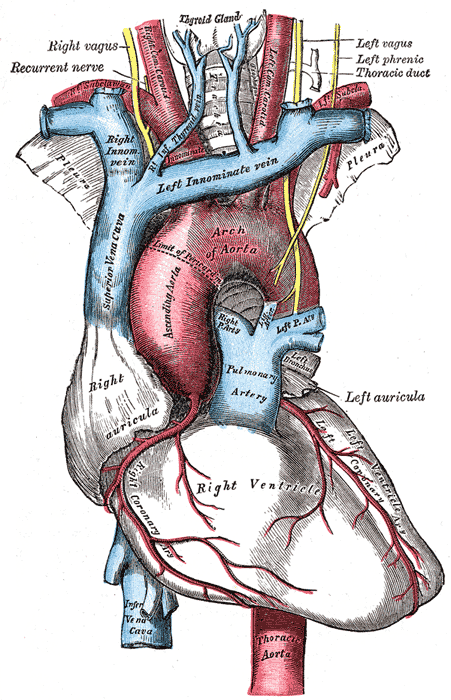
- Anterior view of heart

Details
- System: Circulatory system
- Artery: Aorta, (Note: From the heart to the body) pulmonary trunk and right and left pulmonary arteries, (Note: Arteries that contain deoxygenated blood, from the heart to the lungs) right coronary artery, left main coronary artery (Note: Supplying blood to the heart itself)
- Vein: Superior vena cava, inferior vena cava, (Note: From the body to the heart) right and left pulmonary veins, (Note: Veins containing oxygenated blood from the lungs to the heart) great cardiac vein, middle cardiac vein, small cardiac vein, anterior cardiac veins (Note: Veins that drain blood from the cardiac tissue itself)
- Nerve: Accelerans nerve, vagus nerve

Identifiers
- Latin: cor

The heart is a muscular organ situated in the mediastinum. It consists of four chambers, four valves, two main arteries (the coronary arteries), and the conduction system. The left and right sides of the heart have different functions: the right side receives de-oxygenated blood through the superior and inferior venae cavae and pumps blood to the lungs through the pulmonary artery, and the left side receives saturated blood from the lungs.

== Heart location, orientation, and projection to the chest ==
=== Location ===
The heart sits in the center of the chest behind the sternum in a region called the mediastinum, between the third and sixth costal cartilages. The heart is wrapped in its own fascia called the pericardial sac separate from other structures in the thorax such as the lungs and thymus. The majority of the heart is located to the left of the sternum.

=== Orientation and size ===
The heart has the shape of a pyramid, with its apex pointing towards the left nipple while its base forms the posterior surface of the heart. Other surfaces are the anterior, inferior (or diaphragmatic), and two pulmonary surfaces facing the lungs. Its longest dimension (apical to base) is broadly 12–13 cm, while the average weight is 250 grams in females and 300 grams in males.

=== Pericardium ===
The pericardium is a thick membrane that covers the heart and separates it from other structures in the thorax such as the lungs and thymus gland. The pericardium consists of two layers: the fibrous pericardium and the serous pericardium. The serous pericardium, also called the epicardium, is thin and covers the heart. The fibrous pericardium is much thicker. Deep to the two pericardium layers, superficial to the heart, is the pericardial cavity, a thin sac filled with a small amount of pericardial fluid. The pericardial cavity has two recesses: the transverse recess and oblique recess. The transverse recess lies behind the aorta and pulmonary trunk, while the oblique recess lies behind the left atrium.

== Fibrous skeleton ==
The four cardiac valves are kept in their place partly because of the fibrous skeleton of the heart, which is a collection of connective tissue. It consists of the right fibrous trigone (which along with the membranous septum forms the central fibrous body), the left right fibrous trigone, and the conus tendon. The right fibrous trigone is the strongest part of the skeleton. It lies to the right of the aortic valve and connects it with the mitral and tricuspid valves. It is pierced by the bundle of His. Lastly, the aortomitral curtain is also a part of the fibrous skeleton; it is formed by fibrous tissue connecting two of three of the aortic valve leaflets (the right and non-coronary leaflet) with anterior leaflet of the mitral valve.

== The four cardiac chambers ==
The heart has four chambers: the left and right atriums and the left and right ventricles. The heart's primary role is to receive the blood from the body, pump it to the lungs to be oxygenated, and receive it once more to pump it again to the rest of the human body tissues. The right side of the heart (which consists of the right atrium and the right ventricle) receives the desaturated blood, while the left side (consisting of the left atrium and left ventricle) receives the oxygenated blood.

The four chambers form a shallow groove at the line of their junction, which form the atrioventricular groove. The atrioventricular groove hosts major coronary arteries while they travel along to the line of attachment of atrioventricular valves. The right and left ventricles are separated by a septum, which corresponds to the interventricular grooves that travel from the posterior to the anterior surface of the heart.

=== Right atrium ===
The right atrium lies among the two venae cavae, behind and somewhat right of the sternum. It is right and anterior to the left atrium. It consists of the venous component (or sina venarum), which is the main, smooth part of the right atrium (auricula or atrium proper). This venous component includes the right appendage, the front and lateral wall of right atrium, and the vestibule of the tricuspid valve. The venous component receives the blood from superior and inferior venae cavae. What separates the two components is the inside appearance of the wall. While the sina venarum has smooth walls, the characteristic of the auricula are the thick muscle bundles that make it appear somewhat rough. Sina venarum corresponds to the right horn of sinus venosus of the embryonic heart.

Externally, the most prominent features of the heart are the right appendage (or right auricle), the sulcus terminalis, and the coronary sulcus. The right appendage is pyramidal in shape, with its base opening at the sina venarum. The sulcus terminalis, or terminal groove, is a shallow groove that travels from the IVC to the SVC and separates the right appendage from the venous compartment of the right ventricle. At the upper end of sulcus terminalis lies the sinoatrial node. The sinoatrial node receives blood supply from a branch of the right coronary artery or circumflex artery in 55% and 45% of people respectively. This artery is called the sinus nodal artery, and it is sometimes visible through the open sternum. Another groove, which runs somewhat parallel and posterior to sulcus terminalis, is Waterstone's groove (also known as Sondergaard's groove).

Internally, the crista terminalis is a prominent muscle bundle from which the pectinate muscles of the right atrium originate. The terminal crest corresponds to the external sulcus terminalis. The fossa ovalis lies on the interatrial wall and is the remnant of the prenatal atrial communication. The opening of the inferior vena cava is guarded by the Eustachian valve, while next to it lies the Thebesian valve that guards the orifice of the coronary sinus. The thebesian veins also drain into the right atrium. Most of the right atrium is trabeculated, as it is covered with pectinate muscles that run parallel to one another.

=== Right ventricle ===
The right ventricle receives blood from the right atrium through the tricuspid valve and pumps it to the lungs. The right ventricle lies behind the sternum and forms a large part of the sternodiaphragmatical surface of the heart. Its inferior surface lies over the central tendon of the diaphragm. The right ventricle consists of an inlet portion that receives blood from the right atrium through the tricuspid valve. There is an apical portion that approaches- but does not reach- the apex of the heart; this apical portion is packed with rough trabeculations. The last portion is a muscular outlet portion (infudibulum) that pumps the blood to the pulmonary artery.The atrioventricular groove, a groove that harbors the right coronary artery of the heart, marks the separation of the atrium and the ventricle. Internally, the crista supraventricularis, a muscular thickener, separates the right ventricle into two spaces.

=== Left atrium ===
The left atrium lies to the left and slightly posterior of the right atrium. The pulmonary artery and aorta are located in front of the left atrium. The left atrium is slightly smaller than the right atrium and consists of the venous component, which receives saturated blood from the lungs via four pulmonary veins, the vestibule, and a narrow appendage. The venous component forms a large part of the posterior wall of the heart and the anterior wall of the oblique pericardial sinus.The appendage of the left atrium is a narrow, finger-like entity that contains small pectinate muscles. Its small orifice lies anterior of the left superior pulmonary vein and lateral to the mitral valve. The tip of the appendage can be found in various positions.

=== Left ventricle ===
The left ventricle is made of thick muscle walls because a lot of power is needed to push blood to the arterial system of the body. It is conical in shape and it is longer than the right ventricle in length, it also occupies part of the anterior (sternocostal), inferior (diaphragmatical), and left wall of heart. The left ventricle forms the apex of the heart and it receives blood from the left atrium through the mitral valve and pumps it to the body through the aortic valve. It consists of an inlet portion (ostium venosum), an outlet portion (ostium arteriosum), and an apical portion. The anterolateral and posteromedial papillary muscles are two strong papillary muscles within the left ventricle that anchor the two leaflets of the mitral valve (the valve between left atrium and ventricle consists of two leaflets). While these two muscles have a thick muscular base, they separate into various tendinous cords before entering the leaflets of the mitral valve. The apical portion is conical and consists of fine trabeculations.

== Coronary circulation ==
The heart is supplied blood from two arterial systems: left and right. The major arteries of the two systems travel within the atrioventricular groove and form a crown shape, thus they are named "coronary arteries". There is significant variation of which system provides blood to the inferior surface of the heart. If the PDA starts from the right coronary artery, then the coronary circulation is named as "right dominance", which is the case with 60% of the general population. The arteries are located in the subepicardium, so they are easily visible in the human eye, but in some cases, especially at their initial course, may be sited within the myocardium.

=== Right coronary system ===
Branches of the right coronary artery
Branch
Conal artery (or infundibular artery)
Sinus artery in 50% of population
Acute marginal artery
Inferior ventricular arteries
Posterior descending artery (or inferior interventricular artery)

The right coronary artery usually lies just above the aortic valve, within the aortic root, in the right coronary sinus that is the anterior surface of the aortic root. It travels anteriorly and slightly to the right to reach the atrioventricular groove; it enters the groove and follows its path to reach the cardiac crux, the place where atrioventricular groove meets the interatrial and interventricular grooves at the posterior surface of the heart. The right coronary artery provides blood to the wall of the right heart and some areas of the left heart though its branches. The right coronary system mostly supplies the right ventricle and atrium, apart from the anterior interventricular septum and a small area neighboring the course of the left anterior descending artery.

=== Left coronary system ===
The left main coronary artery begins at the posterior sinus of the aortic root. It is the largest coronary artery, as the myocardium supplied by this artery is larger than the coronary artery, although it becomes short as soon as it separates in the anterior interventricular (also known as left anterior descending or LAD) and circumflex artery. The LAD travels within the interventricular groove and gives of diagonal and septal branches. Diagonal branches supply the anterior surface of the heart while septal branches supply the muscle mass of the interventricular septum; the first one supplies the atrioventricular bundle at the point of its bifurcation. The circumflex artery is embedded within the atrioventricular groove, travels laterally to the left and curves to the posterior surface of the heart, where it usually diminishes at the crux area (where it sometimes supplies the posterior descending artery (in case of left dominance)). The left coronary system mainly supplies the left heart and a large part of the interventricular septum.

=== Heart rate ===
Heart rate, defined as the number of times the heart beats per minute, can fluctuate due to the body's varying needs for oxygen and nutrients. In addition, heart rates can increase when the sympathetic nervous system is activated but decrease when the parasympathetic nervous system is activated. The sympathetic nervous system can prepare the body for stressful situations by defaulting to “fight or flight”. The parasympathetic nervous system on the other hand regulates “rest and digest” when at ease or safe. Although the parasympathetic nervous system prevails, specific mental, physical, or environmental stressors trigger the sympathetic nervous system, and thus, increase heart rate.

=== Veins and lymphatics ===
Two separate systems of returning blood from the myocardial mass to the cardiac cavities. The major system consists of the coronary sinus, a wide vessel that collects blood from smaller veins and drains it to the right atrium. The smaller system consists of smaller veins that are draining the inner part of cardiac mass directly to cardiac cavities, most commonly to right atrium. There are three distinct lymphatic drainage plexuses in the heart; after anastomosing each other, they end up in a brachiocephalic node.

=== Anomalous origin of coronary arteries ===
In approximately 1% of humans, coronary arteries originate in a not typical position. Among that 1%, the most common abnormality is circumflex arising from right coronary artery, instead of left main artery and usually does not pose any problem. Other abnormalities are coronary arteries originating from a not typical sinus and then traveling either between the aorta and pulmonary artery, or intramural. In both cases, outside pressure causes ischaemia and thus angina.

== Valves of the heart ==
There are four major valves in the heart, two atrioventricular valves (connecting one atrium to a ventricle) and two arterial (or semilunar) valves guarding the outflow of blood from the human heart. Each atrioventricular valve (tricuspid and mitral valves) consists of the leaflets, the annulus, the tendinous cords, the papillary muscles, and the supporting muscle mass. Semilunar valves (pulmonary and aortic valves) consists of leaflets, the sinuses and the interleaflet triangles.

=== Aortic valve ===
Aortic valve is in between the muscular left ventricle and the fibroelastic aorta, the biggest artery of the human body. Its three leaflet close when hydrostatic pressure applies over the valve, while kept open during the ejection phase of the cardiac cycle, when blood is pushed out of the heart by the contracting musculare of the left ventricle. Histologically, the leaflets are fibrous in their core, covered with endothelium; a thickening at their free edge, is named node of Arantius. The aortic leaflets are hinged at the beginning of the aorta, at very first part of aortic sinus. Their line of attachment is not circular, it rather creates a corona, nonetheless it is commonly named as "aortic ring".

Each of the three aortic valve leaflets is named after the orifice of the coronary artery located above the leaflet- one is named non-coronary leaflet as it lacks a coronary ostium. Left and right leaflet originate from the muscle fibers of left ventricle, while non coronary leaflet is in continuation with mitral valve's anterior leaflet forming the aortic-mitral curtain.

=== Mitral valve ===
Mitral valve separates left atrium with left ventricle. It consists of the two mitral leaflets, (anterior and posterior) sited within the mitral annulus. Chordae tendineae are attached to the ventricular surfaces and the free edges of the two leaflets. Chordae are also attached to the two papillary muscles of left ventricle. Anterior leaflet is much larger than the posterior leaflet but posterior has a broader base, approaching two thirds of circumflex

=== Tricuspid valve ===
Tricuspid valve separates right chambers- atrium from ventricle. As its name suggest, it has 3 leaflets (anterior, posterior and septal), all attached at the annulus of the leaflet that notably lacks any fibrotic tissue. Apart from the leaflets and annulus, it also consists of three papillary muscles and three sets of chordae tendineae.

=== Pulmonary valve ===
The pulmonary valve, a semilunar valve, separates the right ventricle from the pulmonary trunk.

== Conduction system ==
Conduction system is a network of cardiac muscle fibers aiming to generate and transduce signals in the heart, so to produce contraction of the heart and thus pulse. Normally, the signal is generated at sinus node, also known as sinoatrial node, since it lies on the right atrial wall, near the orifice of superior vena cava. Usually, a rather large artery, named sinus artery, supplies the node. Various pathways initiate from sinus node, and carry the signal through the wall of both right and left atrium. They all end in atrioventricular node. This latter node lies on the floor of atrioventricular septum, just above the orifice of Coronary Sinus. From the atrioventricular node, the buddle of His, that travels along the interventricular septum and spits the to left and right buddle branches. They supply left and right ventricle respectively.

== Sources ==
- Anderson, Robert H.; Spicer, Diane E.; Hlavacek, Anthony M.; Cook, Andrew C.; Backer, Carl L. (25 July 2013). Wilcox's Surgical Anatomy of the Heart. Cambridge University Press. ISBN 978-1-107-01448-0.
- Cook, Andrew C.; Wilcox, Benson R.; Anderson, Robert H. (2010). "Surgical anatomy of the heart". In Frank Sellke (ed.). Sabiston Textbook of Surgery: The Biological Basis of Modern Surgical Practice. W.B. Saunders. ISBN 978-0-7216-8269-3.
- Berdajs, Denis; Turina, Marko (28 August 2011). Operative Anatomy of the Heart. Springer Science & Business Media. ISBN 978-3-540-69229-4.
- Weinhaus, Anthony J. (2015). Iaizzo Paul A. (ed.). Handbook of Cardiac Anatomy, Physiology, and Devices. Springer Science & Business Media. ISBN 978-3-319-19463-9.
- Kouchoukos, Nicholas; Blackstone, E. H.; Hanley, F. L.; Kirklin, J. K. (2013). Kirklin/Barratt-Boyes Cardiac Surgery E-Book (4th ed.). Elsevier. ISBN 978-1-4160-6391-9.
- Loukas, Marios; Groat, Christopher; Khangura, Rajkamal; Owens, Deyzi Gueorguieva; Anderson, Robert H. (2009). "The normal and abnormal anatomy of the coronary arteries". Clinical Anatomy. 22 (1). Wiley: 114–128. doi:10.1002/ca.20761. ISSN 0897-3806. PMID 19097062. S2CID 33929505.
- Mestres, Carlos A.; Bernal, Jose M.; Pomar, Jose L. (2016). "Surgical Treatment of Tricuspid Valve Diseases". In Frank Sellke; Pedro J. del Nido (eds.). Sabiston and Spencer Surgery of the Chest. ISBN 978-0-323-24126-7.
- Ong; Binder, Chin Siang; Jacobs, Ronald K.; Cameron, Duke E (2021). Taggart D.P.; Puskas J.D. (eds.). State of the Art Surgical Coronary Revascularization. Oxford University Press. ISBN 978-0-19-875878-5.
- Skandalakis, John E. (2004). Skandalakis' surgical anatomy: the embryologic and anatomic basis of modern surgery. Paschalidis Medical Publications. ISBN 978-960-399-119-9.
- Standring, Susan (2016). Gray's anatomy: the anatomical basis of clinical practice (41 ed.). Elsevier Limited. pp. 994–1023. ISBN 978-0-7020-5230-9.
- Zhu, Xiaodong (2015). Surgical Atlas of Cardiac Anatomy. Springer. ISBN 978-94-017-9409-1.
