= Coronary artery bypass surgery =

Surgical procedure to restore normal blood flow to an obstructed coronary artery

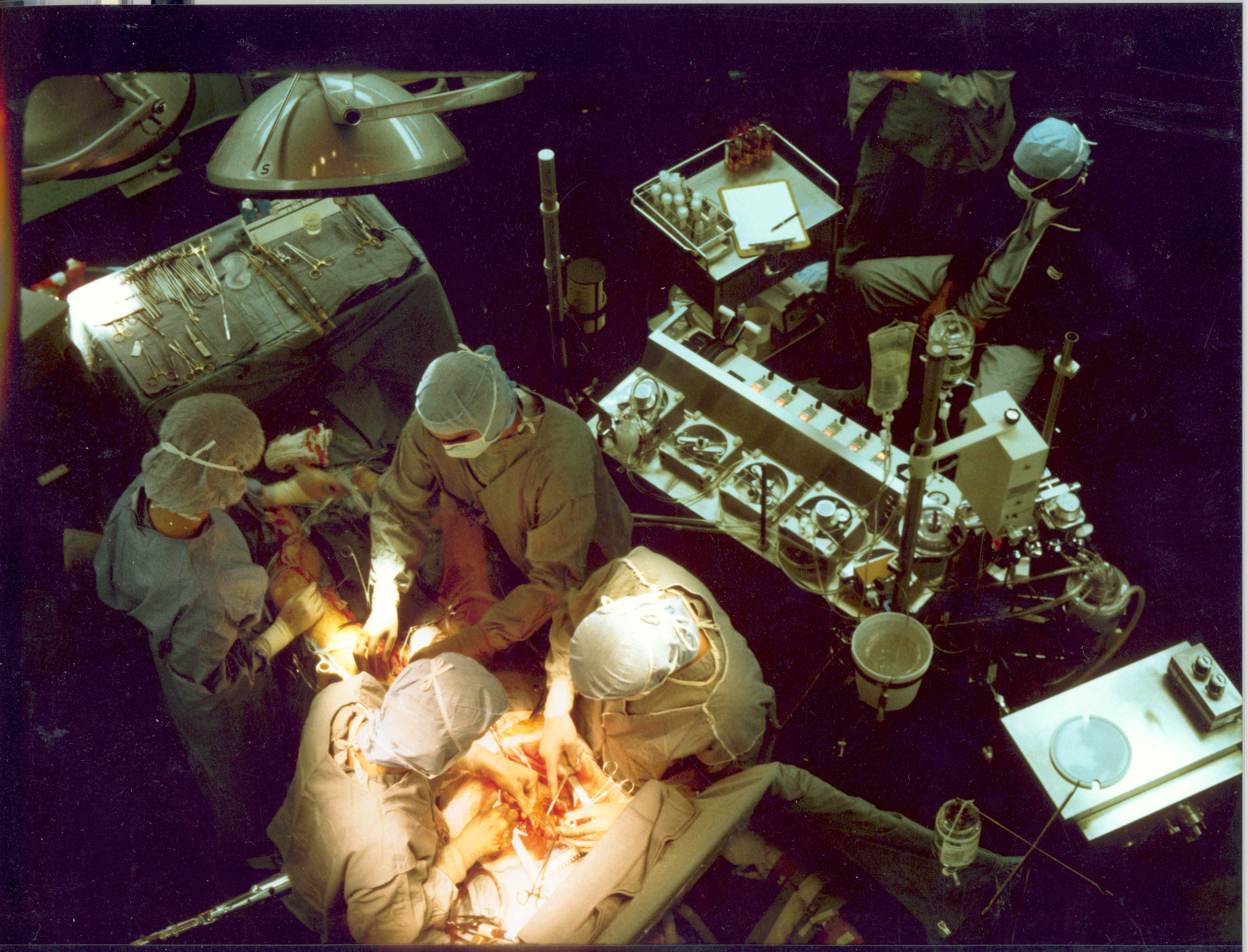
- Early in a coronary artery bypass operation, during vein harvesting from the legs (left of image) and the establishment of cardiopulmonary bypass by placement of an aortic cannula (bottom of image). The perfusionist and heart-lung machine are on the upper right. The patient's head (not seen) is at the bottom.
- Other names: Coronary artery bypass graft
- Specialty: Cardiac surgery
- ICD-10-PCS: 021209W
- ICD-9-CM: 36.1
- MeSH: D001026
- MedlinePlus: 002946

Coronary artery bypass surgery, also called coronary artery bypass graft (CABG /ˈkæbɪdʒ/ KAB-ij, like "cabbage"), is a surgical procedure to treat coronary artery disease (CAD), the buildup of plaques in the arteries of the heart. It can relieve chest pain caused by CAD, slow the progression of CAD, and increase life expectancy. It aims to bypass narrowings in heart arteries by using arteries or veins harvested from other parts of the body, thus restoring adequate blood supply to the previously ischemic (deprived of blood) heart.

There are two main approaches. The first uses a cardiopulmonary bypass machine, operated by a perfusionist, a machine which takes over the functions of the heart and lungs during surgery by circulating blood and oxygen. With the heart in cardioplegic arrest, harvested arteries and veins are used to connect across problematic regions—a construction known as surgical anastomosis. In the second approach, called the off-pump coronary artery bypass (OPCAB), these anastomoses are constructed while the heart is still beating. The anastomosis supplying the left anterior descending branch is the most significant one and usually, the left internal mammary artery is harvested for use. Other commonly employed sources are the right internal mammary artery, the radial artery, and the great saphenous vein.

Effective ways to treat chest pain (specifically, angina, a common symptom of CAD) have been sought since the beginning of the 20th century. In the 1960s, CABG was introduced in its modern form and has since become the main treatment for significant CAD. Significant complications of the operation include bleeding, heart problems (heart attack, arrhythmias), stroke, infections (often pneumonia) and injury to the kidneys.

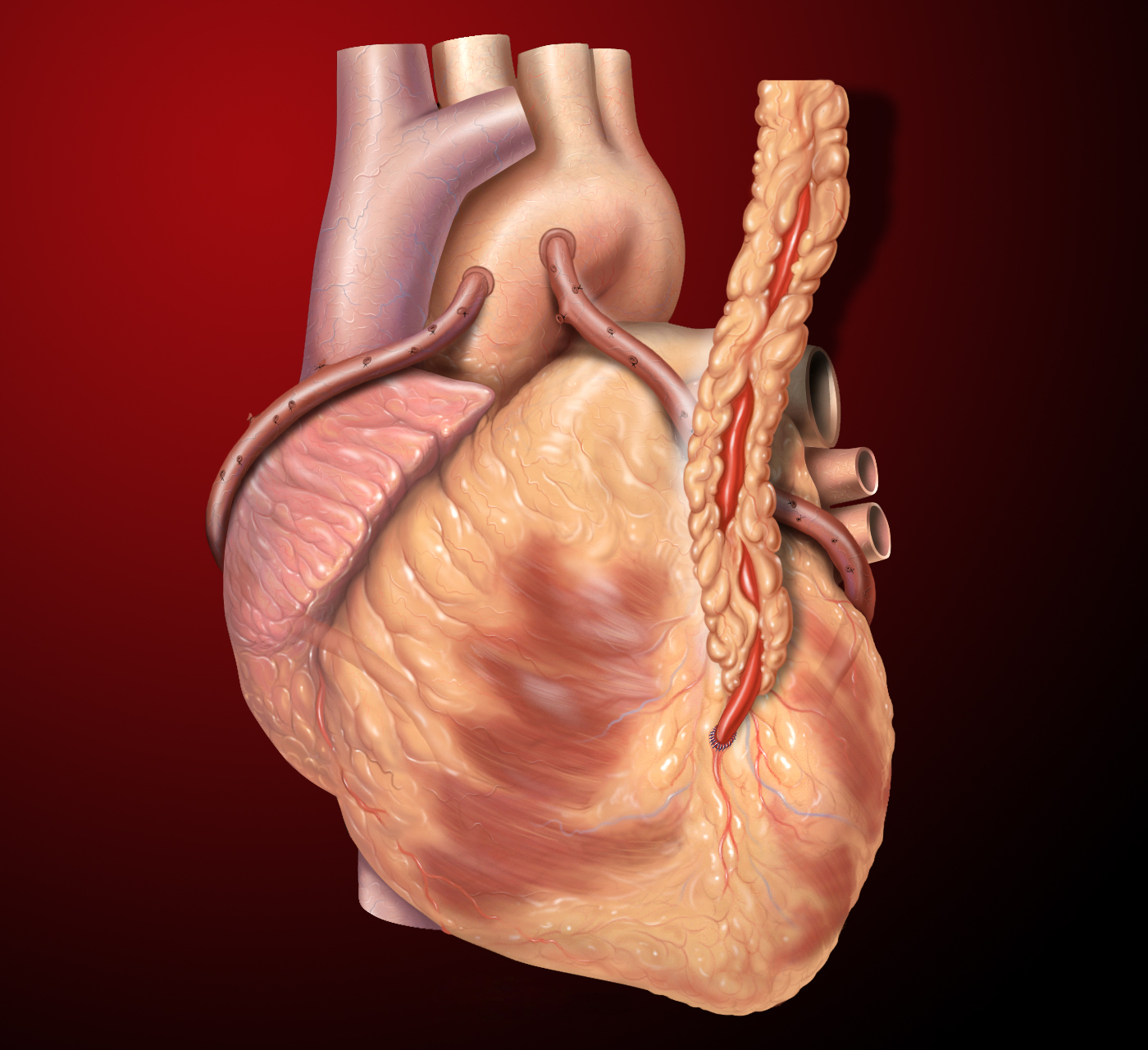
Three coronary artery bypass grafts, a pedicled LITA to LAD and two saphenous vein grafts – one to the right coronary artery system and one to the obtuse marginal system.

== Uses ==
Coronary artery bypass surgery aims to prevent death from coronary artery disease and improve quality of life by relieving angina, the associated feeling of chest pain. The decision to perform surgery is informed by studies of CABG's efficacy in different patient subgroups, based on the lesions' anatomy or how well the heart is functioning. These results are compared with that of other strategies, most importantly percutaneous coronary intervention (PCI).

=== Coronary artery disease ===
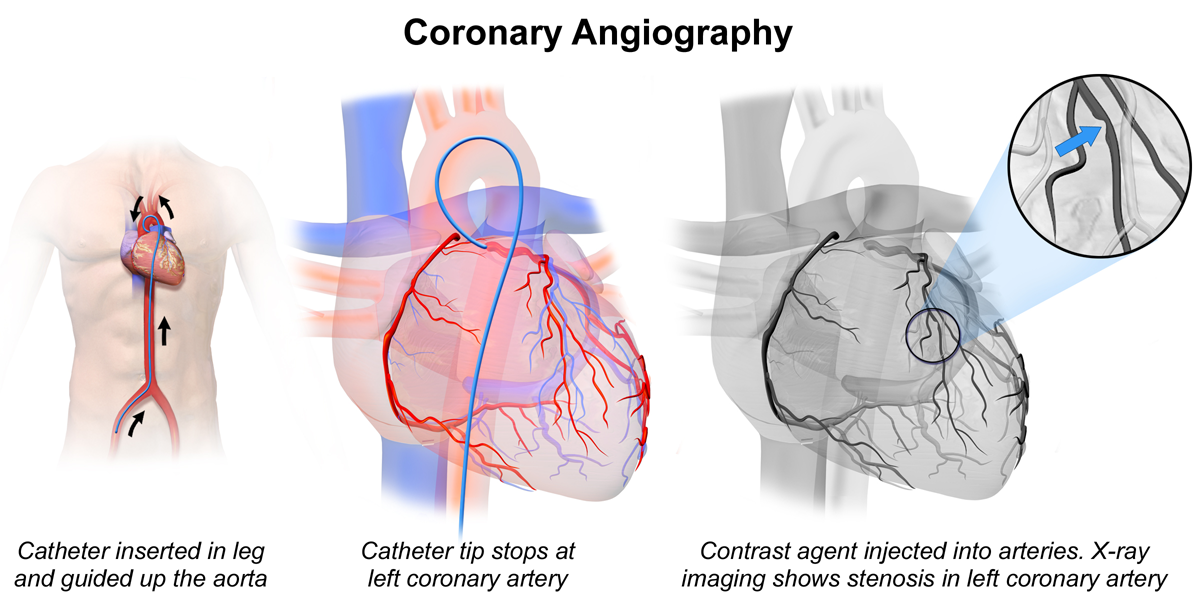
With a coronary angiography, stenotic lesions of the coronary arteries are identified.

Coronary artery disease is caused when coronary arteries of the heart accumulate atheromatous plaques, causing stenosis (narrowing) in one or more arteries and risking myocardial infarction, the interruption of blood supply to the heart. CAD can occur in any of the major vessels of the coronary circulation: the left main stem, left ascending artery, circumflex artery, and right coronary artery, and branches thereof. CAD symptoms vary from none, to chest pain only when exercising (stable angina), to chest pain even at rest (unstable angina). It can even manifest as a myocardial infarction; if blood flow to the heart is not restored within a few hours, whether spontaneously or by medical intervention, the blood-deprived part of the heart becomes necrotic (dies) and is scarred. It may lead to other complications such as arrhythmias, rupture of the papillary muscles of the heart, or sudden death.

There are various methods of detecting and assessing CAD. Apart from history and clinical examination, noninvasive methods include electrocardiography (ECG) at rest or during exercise, and X-ray of the chest. Echocardiography can quantify heart functioning by measuring, for example, enlargement of the left ventricle, the ejection fraction, and the situation of the heart valves. The most accurate ways to detect CAD are the coronary angiogram and the coronary CT angiography. An angiogram can provide detailed anatomy of coronary circulation and lesions. The significance of each lesion is determined by the diameter loss. A diameter loss of 50% translates to a 75% cross-sectional area loss, considered moderate by most groups. Severe stenosis constitutes a diameter loss of 2/3 or more—a greater-than-90% loss of cross-sectional area. To more accurately determine the severity of stenosis, interventional cardiologists may also employ intravascular ultrasound, which can determine the severity and provide information on the composition of the atheromatous plaque. With the technique of fractional flow reserve, the pressure after the stenosis is compared to mean aortic pressure. If the ratio is less than 0.80, then the stenosis is deemed significant.

=== Indications for CABG ===
==== Stable patients ====
People with angina during exercise are usually first treated with medical therapy. Noninvasive tests help estimate which patients might benefit from undergoing coronary angiography. Generally, if portions of cardiac wall are receiving less blood than normal, coronary angiography is indicated; then, lesions are identified and inform a decision to undergo PCI or CABG.

CABG is generally preferred over PCI when there is a significant burden of plaque on the coronary arteries, that is extensive and complex, due to survival benefit. Other indicators that a patient will benefit more from CABG rather than PCI include: decreased left-ventricle function; left main disease; diabetes; and complex triple system disease (including LAD, Cx and RCA), especially when the lesion in the LAD is at its proximal part.

==== Acute coronary syndrome ====
During an acute heart event, known as acute coronary syndrome, it is paramount to quickly restore blood flow to heart tissue. Typically, patients arrive at the hospital with chest pain. They are first treated with drugs, particularly the strongest drugs that prevent clots within vessels (dual anti-platelet therapy: aspirin and clopidogrel). Patients at risk of ongoing ischemia undergo PCI to restore blood flow and thus oxygen delivery to the struggling heart. If PCI failed to restore blood flow because of anatomical considerations or other technical problems, urgent CABG is indicated to save heart tissue. The timing of the operation plays a role in survival: It is preferable to delay the surgery if possible (three days if the infarction affecting the total thickness of the cardiac muscle, and six hours if it does not).

CABG is also indicated when there are mechanical complications of an infarction (ventricular septal defect, papillary muscle rupture or myocardial rupture). There are no absolute contraindications of CABG, but severe disease of other organs such as the liver or brain, limited life expectancy, and patient fragility are considered.

==== Other cardiac surgery ====
CABG is also performed when a patient is to undergo another cardiac surgical procedure, most commonly for valve disease, and angiography reveals a significant lesion of the coronary arteries. CABG can also address dissection of coronary arteries, where a rupture of the coronary layers creates a pseudo-lumen (cavity) and diminishes blood delivery to the heart. Such a dissection may be caused by pregnancy, tissue diseases like Ehlers–Danlos syndromes and Marfan syndrome, cocaine abuse, or PCI. A coronary aneurysm may also indicate CABG: A blood clot might develop within the vessel and travel downstream.

=== CABG versus PCI ===
CABG and percutaneous coronary intervention (PCI) are the two methods to restore blood flow caused by stenotic lesions of the coronary arteries. The choice of method is still a matter of debate, but it is clear that in the presence of complex lesions, significant left main disease, or diabetes, CABG yields better long-term survival and outcomes. Strong indications for CABG also include symptomatic patients and impaired left ventricle function. CABG offers better results than PCI in left main disease and in CAD that affects multiple vessels, because of the protection arterial conduits offer to the native arteries of the heart, by producing vasodilator factors and preventing the advancement of plaques. Studies published in 2023 show that CABG in patients with left main disease is associated with lower mortality and fewer adverse events compared to PCI.

Patients with unprotected left main disease—when the runoff of the left main artery is not protected by a patent graft since a previous CABG operation—have been studied as a group. A 2016 European study found that in these patients, CABG outperforms PCI in the long run (5 years). Another 2016 study found that PCI has similar results to CABG at 3 years, but that CABG becomes better than PCI after 4 years.

A 2012 trial and followup in diabetic patients demonstrated a significant advantage to CABG over PCI. The relative advantage remained evident at 3.8-year and 7.5-year follow ups, which found particular benefits in smokers and younger patients. A 2015 trial compared CABG and the latest technological advancement of PCI, second-generation drug-eluting stents in multivessel disease. Their results indicated that CABG is a better option for CAD patients. A trial published in 2021, comparing results after one year, also concluded that CABG is a safer option than PCI. A large study published in 2023 showed that PCI patients had higher mortality than CABG patients with left main coronary artery disease.

== Procedure ==
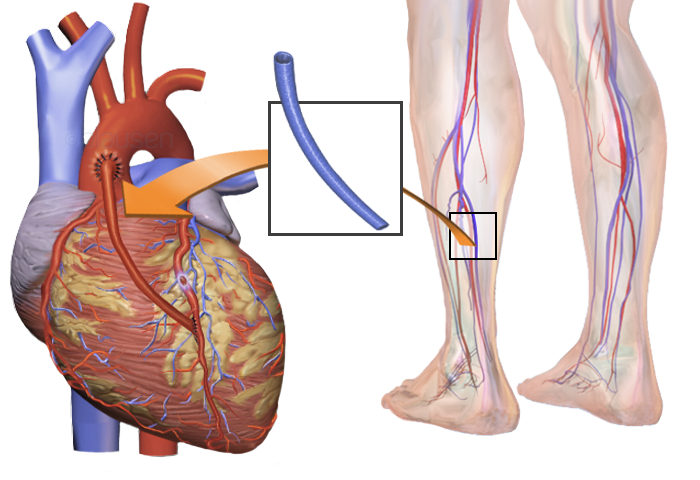
Illustration of a typical coronary artery bypass surgery. A vein from the leg is removed and grafted to the coronary artery to bypass a blockage at LAD.

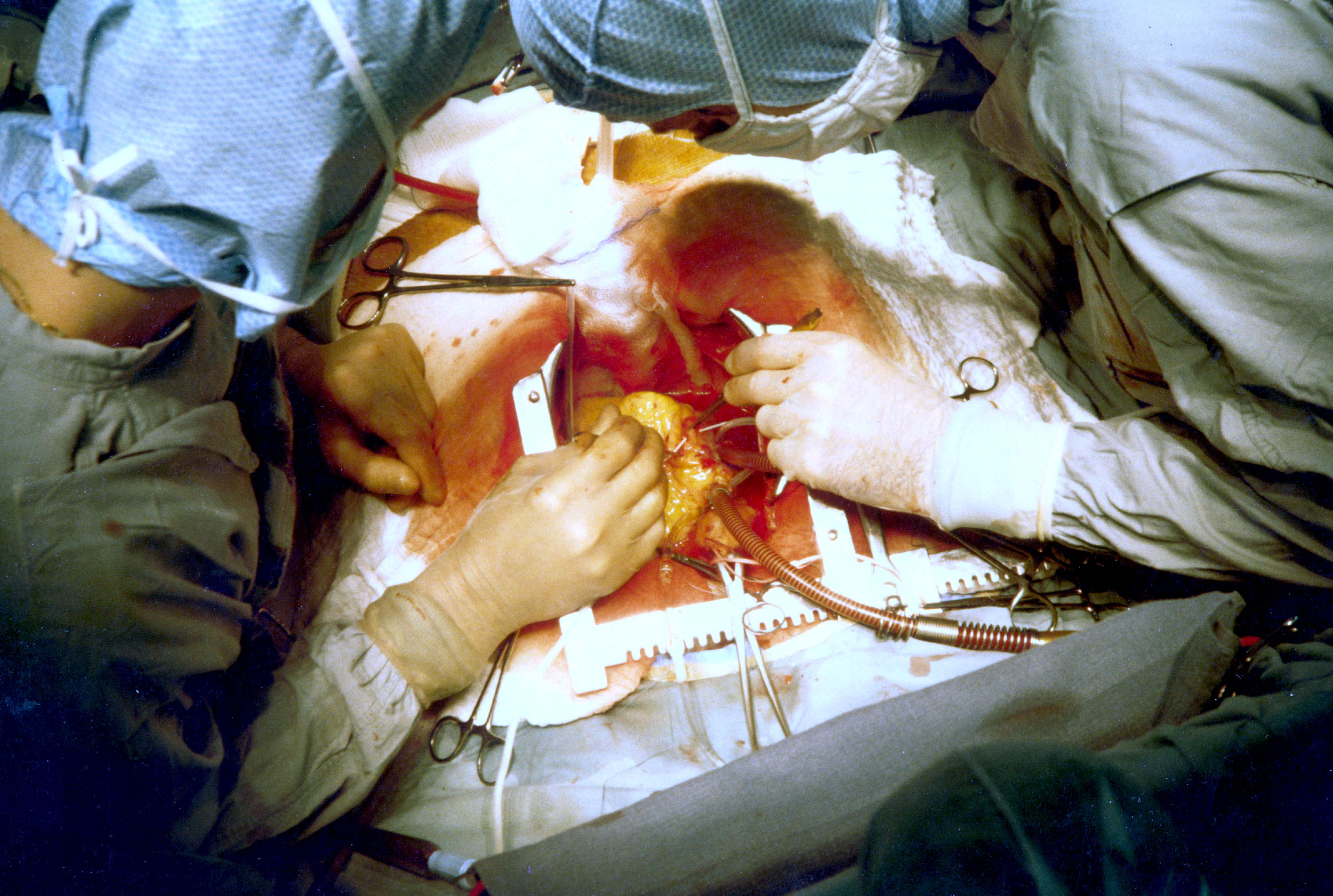
Coronary artery bypass surgery during mobilization (freeing) of the right coronary artery from its surrounding adipose tissue (yellow). The tube visible at the bottom is the aortic cannula, which returns blood from the heart–lung machine. The tube above it (obscured by the surgeon on the right) is the venous cannula, which receives blood from the body. The patient's heart is stopped and the aorta is cross-clamped. The patient's head (not seen) is at the bottom.

=== Preoperative examination and strategy ===
Routine preoperative examination aims to check the status of systems and organs besides the heart. The examination typically includes a chest X-ray to check the lungs, a complete blood count, and kidney and liver function tests. Physical examination to determine the quality of the grafts or the safety of removing them, such as varicosities in the legs, or the Allen test in the arm is performed to be sure that blood supply to the arm will not be critically disturbed.

A patient taking anticoagulants—aspirin, clopidogrel, ticagrelol and others—will stop taking them several days before, to prevent excessive bleeding during and after the operation. Warfarin is also stopped for the same reason and the patient starts taking heparin products after the INR falls below 2.0.

After the angiogram is reviewed by the surgical team, targets are selected (that is, which native arteries will be bypassed and where the anastomosis should be placed). Ideally, all major lesions in significant vessels should be addressed. Most commonly, the left internal thoracic artery (LITA; formerly, left internal mammary artery, LIMA) is anastomosed to the left anterior descending artery (LAD) because the LAD is the most significant artery of the heart and supplies blood to a larger portion of myocardium than other arteries.

A conduit can be used to graft one or more native arteries. In the latter case, an end-to-side anastomosis is performed. In the former, using a sequential anastomosis, a graft can then deliver blood to two or more native vessels of the heart. Also, the proximal part of a conduit can be anastomosed to the side of another conduit. It is preferred not to harvest too much conduit because it might necessitate re-operation.

=== With cardiopulmonary bypass machine (on-pump) ===
The intubated patient is brought to the operating theater. Lines (e.g., peripheral IV cannulae, central lines such as internal jugular cannulae) are inserted for drug administration and monitoring. A description of a traditional CABG follows.

Harvesting

An incision in the sternum is made while vessels are being harvested, either from the arms or chest or from the leg, usually from the internal mammary artery or the saphenous vein. The LITA is harvested through the sternotomy. There are two common ways of mobilizing the LITA: the pedicle (i.e., a pedicle consisting of the artery plus surrounding fat and veins) and the skeletonized (i.e., freed of other tissues). Before the LITA is divided in its more distal part, the anticoagulant heparin is administered to the patient via a peripheral line, to prevent clots.

Catheterization and establishment of cardiopulmonary bypass

After harvesting, the pericardium—the sac that surrounds the heart—is opened and stay sutures are placed to keep it open. Purse string sutures are placed in the aorta to prepare the insertions of the cannula into the aorta, and a catheter which temporarily arrests the heart using a solution high in potassium. Another purse string is placed in the right atrium for the venous cannula. Once the cannulas and the catheter are placed, cardiopulmonary bypass (CPB) is commenced. Deoxygenated blood arriving to the heart from veins is forwarded to the CPB machine to get oxygenated, then delivered to the aorta to keep the rest of the body saturated. The blood is often cooled to 32–34 °C (90–93 °F) to slow metabolism and minimize the demand for oxygen. A clamp is placed on the aorta between the cardioplegic catheter and aortic cannula, so that the flow of cardioplegic solution may be controlled by adjusting the clamp. Within minutes, the heart stops beating.

Anastomosis (grafting)

With the heart still, the tip of the heart is taken out of pericardium so that native arteries lying on the posterior side of the heart are accessible. Usually, distal anastomoses are constructed first (first to the right coronary system, then to the circumflex) and then the sequential anastomosis if necessary. Surgeons check the anastomosis for patency (whether it is sufficiently open) or leaking. They then insert the graft within the pericardium, sometimes attached to the cardioplegic catheter. The anastomosis of the LIMA to the LAD is usually the last distal anastomosis to be constructed; while it is being constructed the blood rewarming process starts (by the CPB). After the anastomosis is completed and checked for leaks, the proximal anastomoses of the conduits, if any, are next. They can be done either with the clamp still on, or after removing the aortic clamp and isolating a small segment of the aorta by placing a partial clamp. That said, aortas burdened by plaques might be damaged or release atheromatous debris by being overhandled.

Weaning from cardiopulmonary bypass and closure

After the proximal anastomoses are done, the clamp is removed and the aorta and conduits de-aired. Pacing wires, which supply a current to assist the heartbeat, might be placed. If the heart and other systems are functioning, CPB is discontinued and cannulae are removed. Protamine is administered to reverse the effect of the anticoagulant heparin. After possible bleeding sites are checked, chest tubes are placed and the sternum is closed.

=== Off-pump ===
Off-pump coronary artery bypass (OPCAB) surgery avoids using the CPB machine by stabilizing small segments of the heart at a time. The surgical team and anesthesiologists must coordinate and take great care to not manipulate the heart too much, lest they compromise the stability of blood flow. Compromise should be detected immediately and appropriate action taken.

Keeping a healthy heartbeat may involve maneuvers like placing atrial wires to protect from bradycardia, or by placing stitches or incisions into the pericardium to help exposure. Snares and tapes are used to facilitate exposure. The aim is to avoid distal ischemia caused by blockage of the vessel supplying distal portions of the left ventricle, so usually LITA to LAD is the first to be anastomosed and others follow. For the anastomosis, a fine tube blowing humidified CO_{2} keeps the surgical field clean of blood. Also, a shunt might be used so the blood can travel past the site of anastomosis. After the distal anastomoses are completed, proximal anastomoses to the aorta are constructed with a partially closed aortic clamp. The rest of the process is similar to on-pump CABG.

=== Alternative approaches and special situations ===
When CABG is performed as an emergency because of a myocardial infarction, the highest priority is to salvage the struggling myocardium. Before operation, an intra-aortic balloon pump (IABP) might be inserted to relieve some of the burden of pumping blood, effectively reducing the amount of oxygen needed by myocardium. During operation, the standard practice is to place the patient on CPB as soon as possible and revascularize the heart with three saphenous veins. A calcified aorta also poses a problem because it is very dangerous to clamp. In this case, the operation can be done as an off-pump CAB using both inferior mesenteric arteries (IMA) or Y, T and sequential grafts. Deep arrest may be induced with hypothermia, lowering the temperature of the body to slightly above 20 °C (68 °F). In cases where a significant artery is totally blocked, it may be possible to remove the plaque and use the same hole in the artery to perform an anastomosis. This technique is called endarterectomy and is usually performed at the right coronary system.

Re-operations of CABG (another CABG operation after a previous one) pose difficulties. The heart may be positioned too close to the sternum and thus at risk when cutting the sternum again, so an oscillating saw is used. The heart may be covered with strong adhesions to adjusting structures. Doctors must decide whether aging grafts should be replaced. Manipulation of vein grafts is avoided because it risks dislodgement of plaque.

Minimally invasive direct coronary artery bypass (MIDCAB) strives to avoid a large incision in the sternum. It utilizes off-pump techniques to place a graft, usually of the LIMA at the LAD. The LIMA is freed through an incision between the left ribs (thoractomy), or even using an endoscope placed in the left chest. Robot-assisted coronary revascularization, which is not yet widely used, avoids the sternum incision to prevent infections and bleeding. Both conduit harvesting and the anastomosis are performed with the aid of a robot, through a thoracotomy. Usually, the procedure is combined with hybrid coronary revascularization, in which methods of CABG and PCI are both employed. Anastomosis of the LIMA to the LAD is performed in the operating theater and other lesions are treated with PCI—either at the operating room immediately following the anastomosis, or several days later.

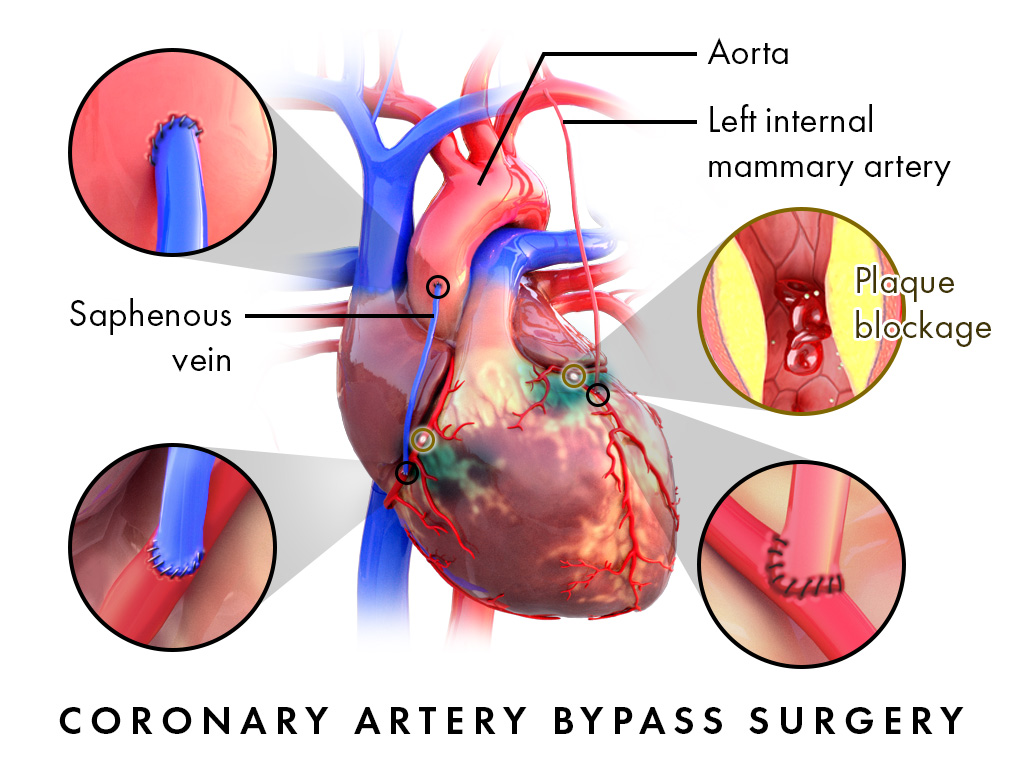
Coronary artery bypass graft

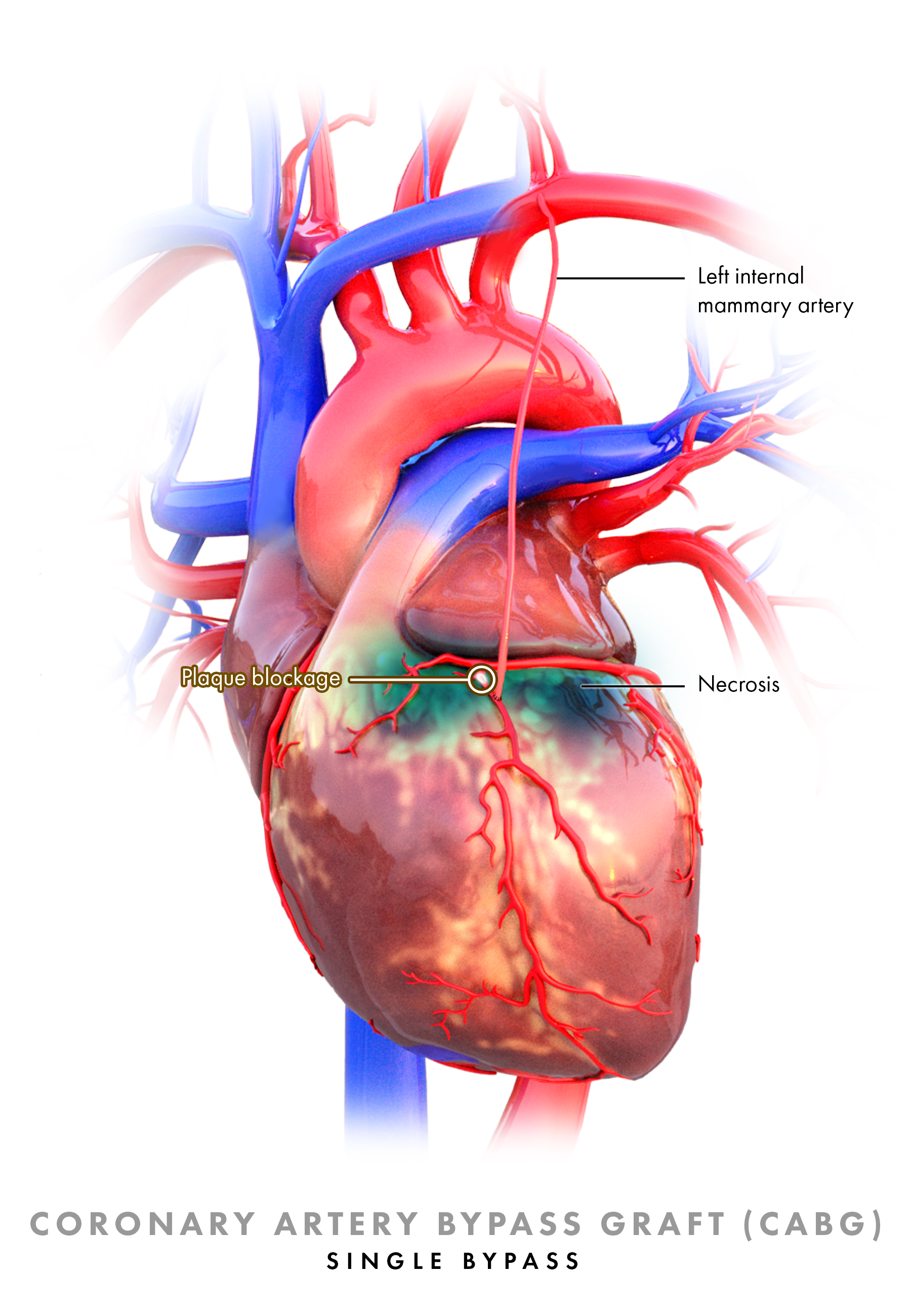
Coronary artery bypass graft, single bypass

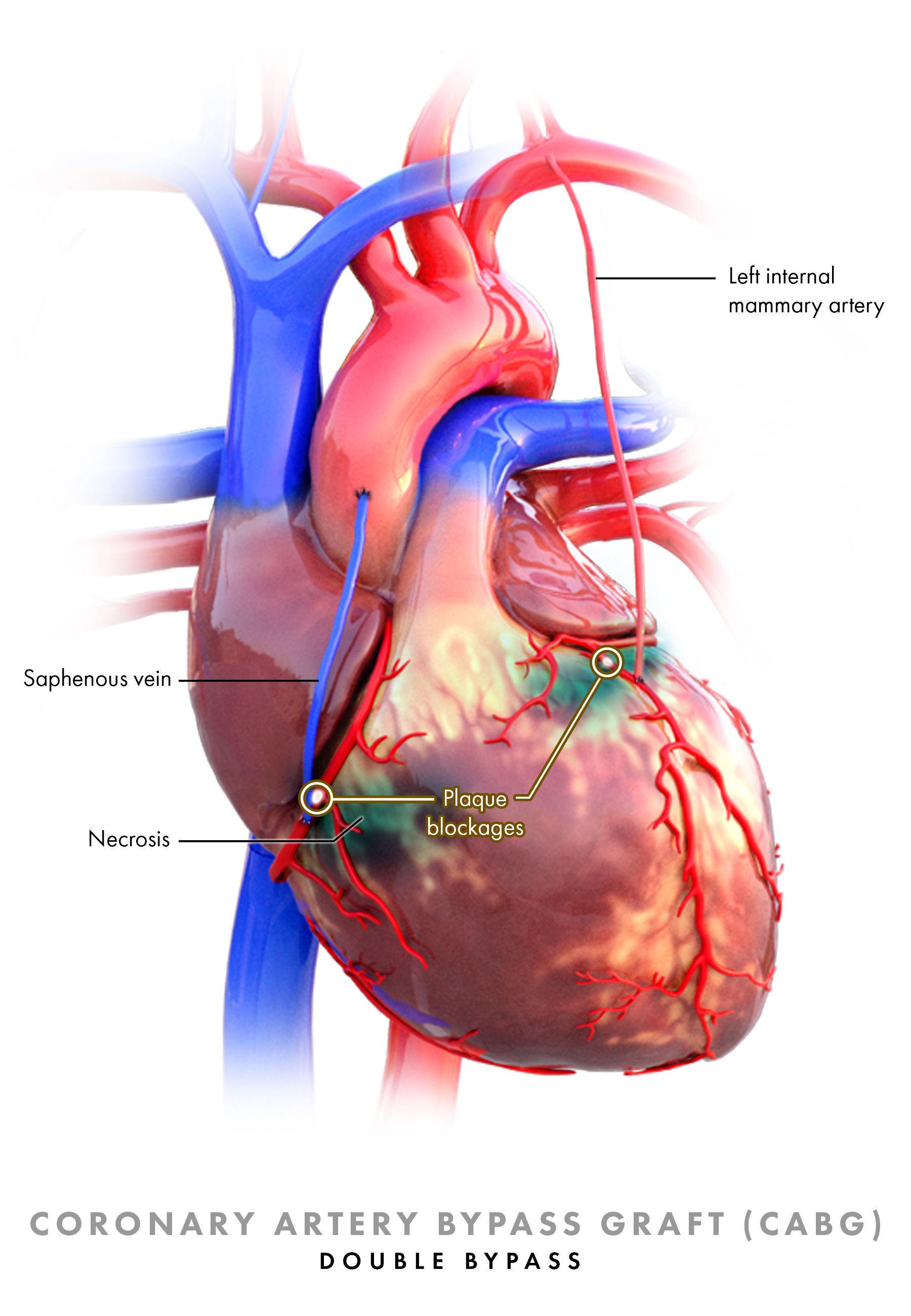
Coronary artery bypass graft, double bypass.

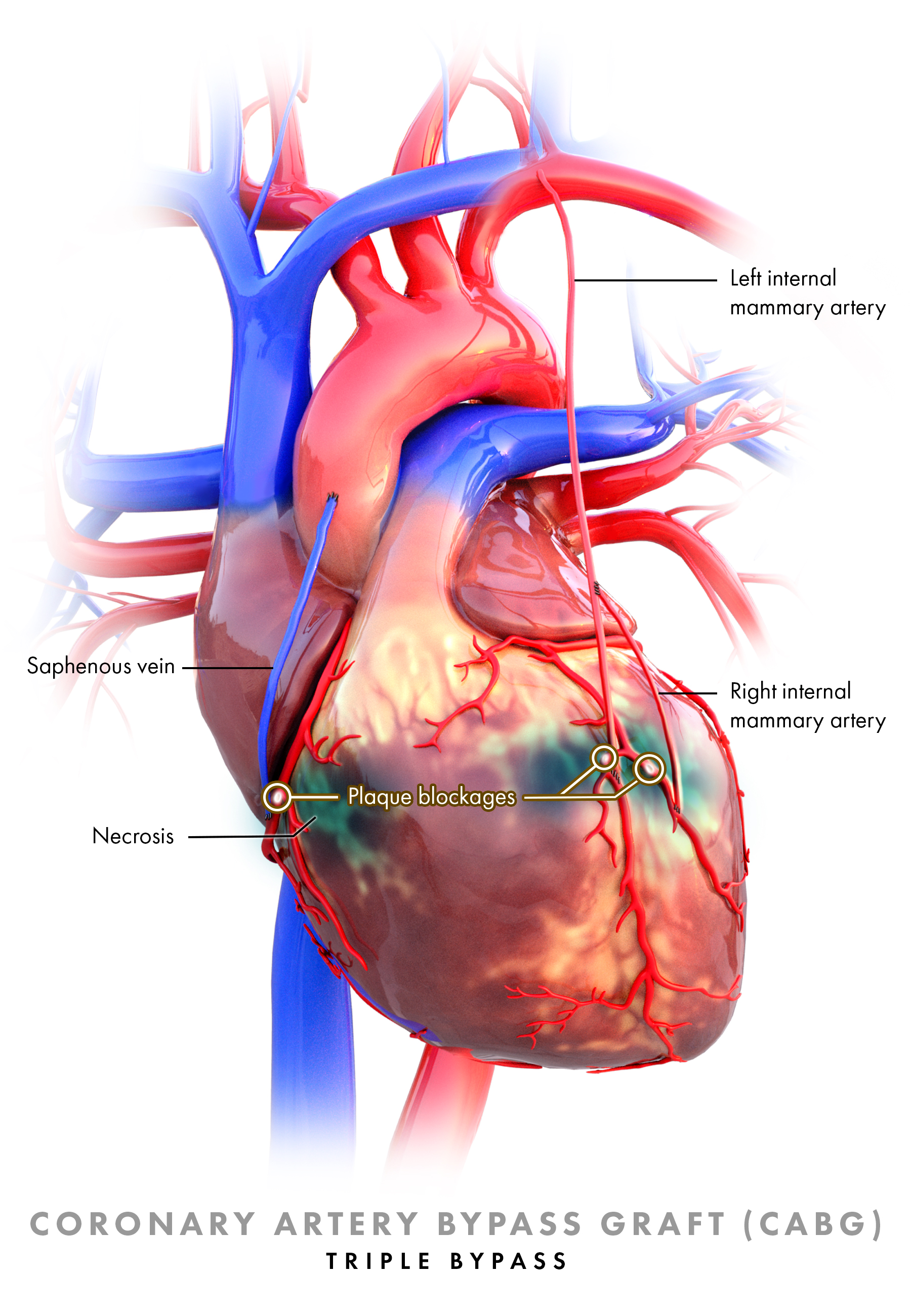
Coronary artery bypass graft, triple bypass

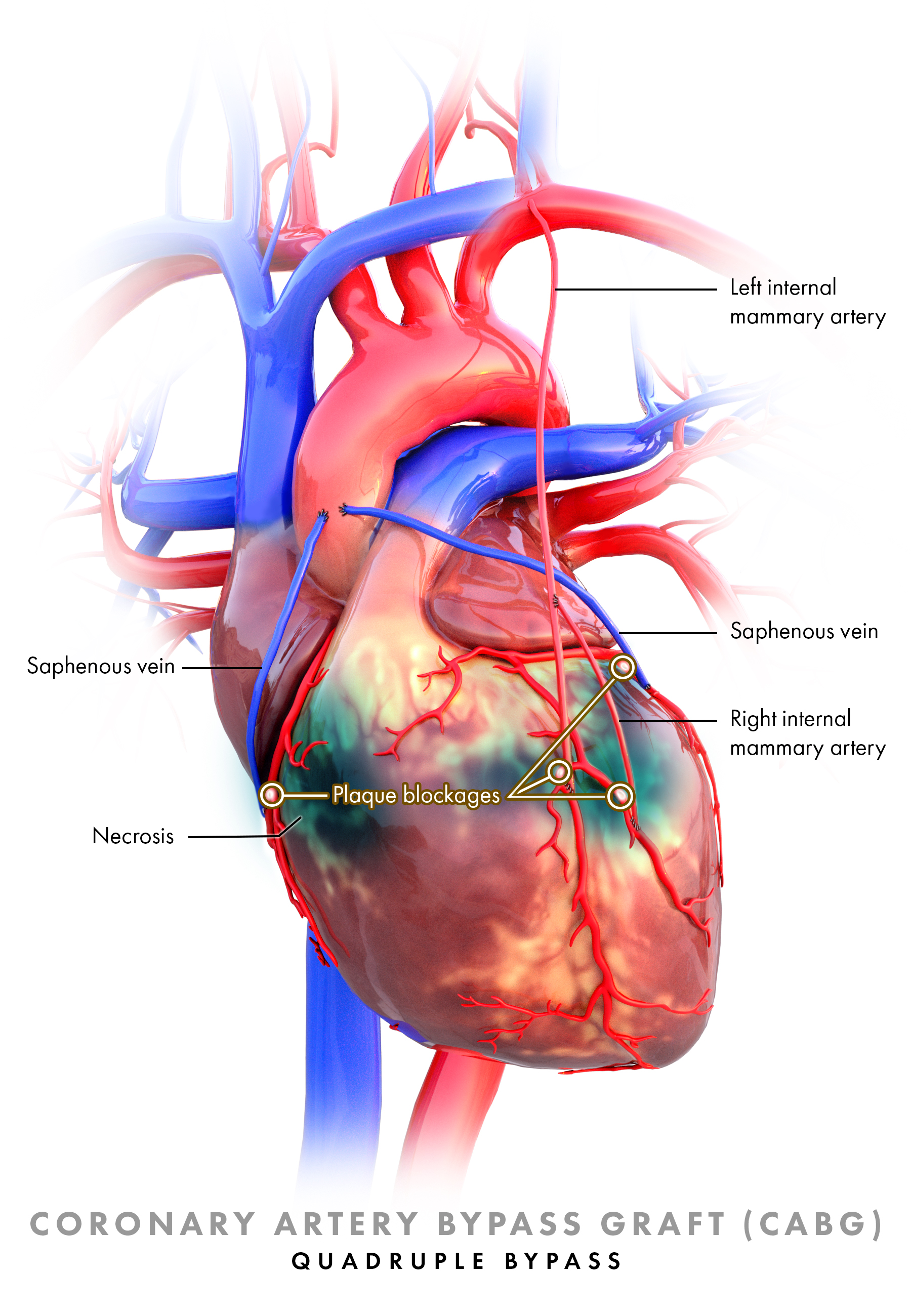
Coronary artery bypass graft, quadruple bypass

== Post-operative care ==
After the procedure, the patient is usually transferred to the intensive care unit (ICU), where intubations are removed if not already done in the operating theater. They usually exit the ICU by the following day, and four days later, if no complications occur, the patient is discharged from the hospital.

A series of drugs are commonly used in early post-operative care. Dobutamine, a beta agent, can increase the cardiac output and is administered some hours after the operation. Beta blockers are used to prevent atrial fibrillation and other supraventricular arrhythmias. Pacing wires attached to both atria, inserted during the operation, may help prevent atrial fibrillation. Aspirin (80 mg) is used to prevent graft failure. Angiotensin-converting enzyme (ACE) inhibitors and angiotensin receptor blockers (ARBs) are used to control blood pressure, especially in patients with low cardiac function (<40%). Amlodipine, a calcium channel blocker, is used for patients whose radial artery was used as a graft.

After the discharge, patients may experience insomnia, low appetite, decreased sex drive, and memory problems. This effect is usually transient and lasts 6 to 8 weeks. A tailored exercise plan is usually beneficial.

== Results ==
CABG is the best procedure to reduce mortality from severe CAD and improve quality of life. Operative mortality strongly relates to the patient's age. According to a study by Eagle et al., patients 50–59 years old have an operative mortality rate of 1.8%, while patients older than 80 have a rate of 8.3%. Other factors that increase mortality are being female, re-operation, dysfunction of the left ventricle, and left main disease. CABG usually relieves angina, but in some patients it reoccurs. Around 60% of patients will be angina-free 10 years after their operation. Myocardial infarction is rare five years after a CABG, but its risk increases with time. The risk of sudden death for CABG patients is low. Quality of life is also high for at least five years, then can slowly start to decline. However, the use of bilateral mammary artery in patients of younger age and those without specific comorbidities (diabetes, obesity, steroid use) can provide excellent long-term survival and quality of life.

The beneficial effects of CABG are clear at the cardiac level. Left-ventricle function is improved and malfunctioning segments of the heart—dyskinetic (moving inefficiently) or even akinetic (not moving)—can show signs of improvement. Both systolic and diastolic functions are improved and keep improving for up to five years in some cases. Left-ventricle function and myocardial perfusion during exercise also improves after CABG. When the left ventricle is severely impaired before operation (ejection fraction below 30%), however, benefits are less impressive in terms of segmental wall movement but still significant because other parameters might improve as LV function improves; the pulmonary hypertension might be relieved and lengthen survival.

Determining the total risk of the procedure is difficult because of the diversity of patients undergoing CABG; different subgroups have different risk, but younger patients see better results than older ones. A CABG using two, rather than one, internal mammary arteries (IMAs) may offer greater protection from CAD, but results are not yet conclusive.

=== Grafts ===
Conduits that can be used for CABG may be arteries or veins. Arteries have a superior long-term patency (expandedness), but veins are more commonly used due to their practicality.

Arterial grafts originate from the part of the internal thoracic artery (ITA) that runs near the edge of sternum, and can easily be mobilized and anastomosed to the native target vessel of the heart. The left artery is most often used because it is closer to the heart, but the right artery is sometimes used, depending on patient and surgeon preferences. The ITAs are advantageous because of their endothelial cells, which produce endothelium-derived relaxing factor and prostacyclin, protecting the artery from atherosclerosis and thus stenosis or occlusion. Disadvantages include a high rate of complications, such as deep sternal wound infections, in some subgroups of patients—mainly obese and diabetic ones. The left radial artery and left gastroepiploic artery can be also used. Long-term patency is influenced by the type of artery used and intrinsic factors of the cardiac arterial circulation.

Veins used are mostly great saphenous veins and, in some cases, the lesser saphenous vein. Their patency rate is lower than that of arteries. Aspirin protects grafts from occlusion; adding clopidogrel does not improve rates.

=== Compared to PCI ===
CABG and PCI are the two methods to revascularize stenotic lesions of the cardiac arteries. The preferences for each patient is still a matter of debate but in the presence of complex lesions and significant Left Main Disease, and in diabetic patients, CABG seems to offer better results in patients than PCI. Strong indications for CABG also include symptomatic patients and those with impaired LV function.

== Complications ==
The most common complications of CABG are postoperative bleeding, heart failure, atrial fibrillation (a form of arrhythmia), stroke, kidney dysfunction, and infection of the wound near the sternum.

Postoperative bleeding occurs in 2–5% of cases and may require returning to the operating room; the most common indicator is the amount of blood being drained by chest tubes, which are inserted during the operation to drain fluid or air from the chest. Bleeding may originate from the aorta, the anastomosis, an insufficiently sealed branch of the conduit, or from the sternum. Other causes include platelet abnormalities or their failure to clot—perhaps due to the bypass or to the rebound heparin effect, which occurs when the anti-coagulant heparin is administered at the beginning of surgery and reappears in the blood after its neutralization by protamine.

Low cardiac output syndrome (LCOS) can occur in up to 14% of CABG patients. According to its severity, LCOS is treated with inotropes, an intra-aortic balloon pump (IABP), optimization of pre-load and afterload, or correction of blood gauzes and electrolytes. The aim is to maintain a systolic blood pressure above 90 mmHg and a cardiac index of more than 2.2 L/min/m^{2}. LCOS is often transient. Myocardial infarction can occur after the operation because of either technical or patient-specific factors. Its incidence is difficult to estimate due to varying definitions, but most studies place its occurrence at between 2% and 5%. The incidence is also dependent on whether it is isolated CABG (average, 4%, range, 0.3%–10%) or a combined operation (average, 2.0%, range, 0.7%–12%). New electrocardiogram features, such as Q waves or ultrasound-documented alternation of cardiac wall motions, are indicative. Ongoing ischemia might prompt emergency angiography and PCI or re-operation. Immediate coronary angiography offers the most expeditious modality not only for diagnosis but also for potential reintervention. Echocardiography is less valuable for the detection or confirmation of postoperative myocardial ischemia. Arrhythmias can also occur, most-commonly atrial fibrillation (incidence of 20–40%) that is treated with correcting electrolyte balance, and rate and rhythm control. However, arrhythmia such as ventricular tachycardia or fibrillation can be a sign of postoperative myocardial ischemia that is treated depending on the cause.

Adverse neurological effects occur after CABG in about 1.5% of patients. They can manifest as type-1 deficits—focal deficits such as stroke or coma—or type-2 global deficits such as delirium caused by CPB, hypoperfusion, or cerebral embolism. Cognitive impairment has been reported in up to 80% cases after CABG at discharge and lasts for a year in up to 40% of cases. The cause remains unclear; CPB is an unlikely cause because even in CABG patients without CPB, as in off-pump CABG, and PCI patients, the incidence is the same.

Infections, such as wound infections in the sternum (superficial or deep) are most commonly caused by Staphylococcus aureus, and may complicate the post-operation process. The harvesting of both two thoracic arteries is a risk factor because it significantly impairs the perfusion of blood through the sternum. Pneumonia can also occur. Complications in the gastrointestinal tract have been described and are most commonly due to medications administered during the operation.

== History ==
=== Pre-CABG ===
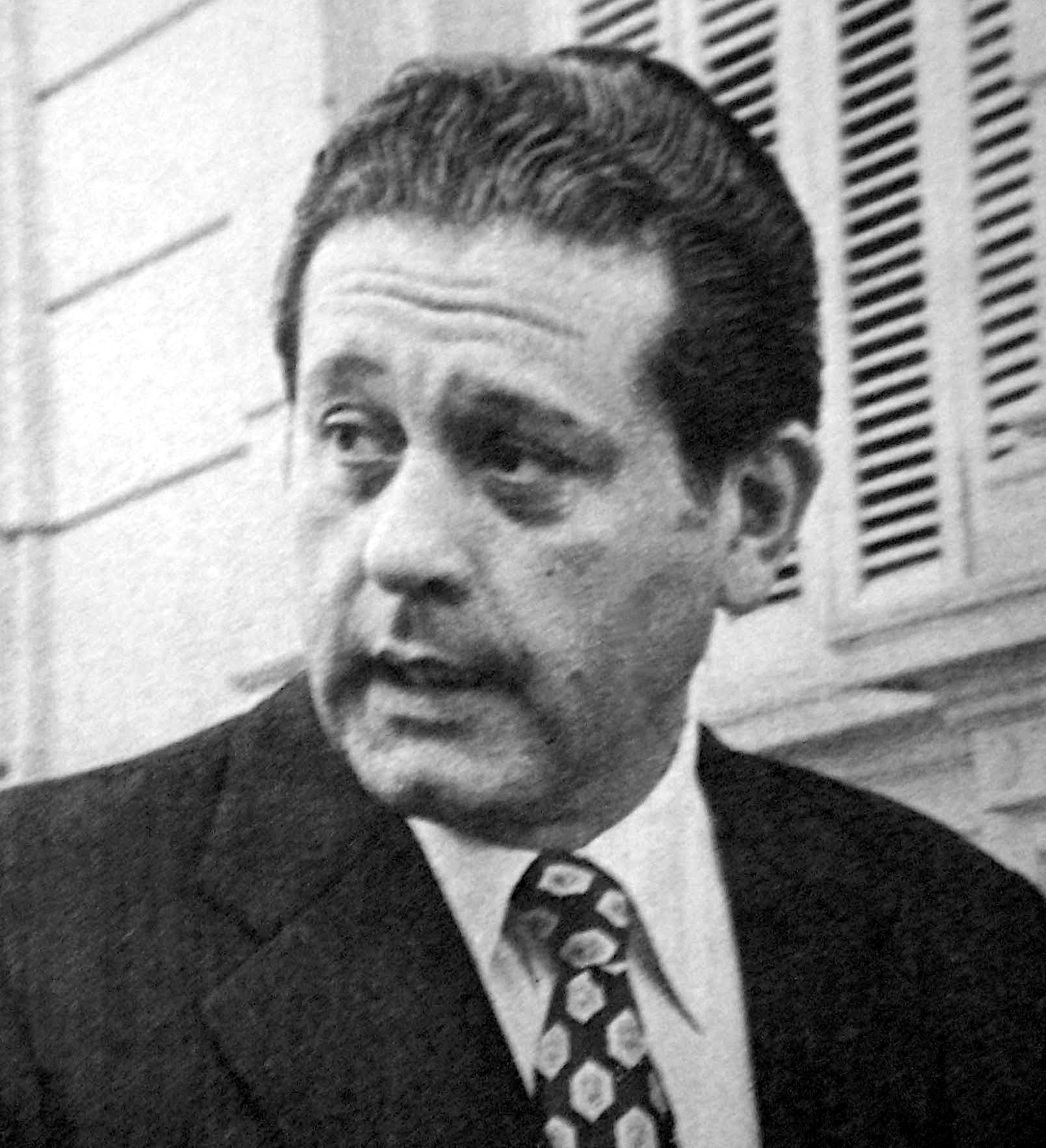
René Gerónimo Favaloro was an Argentine cardiac surgeon and educator best known for his pioneering work on coronary artery bypass surgery using the great saphenous vein.

In the early 20th century, surgical interventions aiming to relieve angina and prevent death were either sympathectomy — a cut on the sympathetic chain that supplies the heart—or pericardial abrasion, with the hope adhesions would create significant collateral circulation. Sympathectomy produced disappointing and inconsistent results. French surgeon Alexis Carrel was the first to anastomose a vessel—a branch of the carotid artery—to a native artery in the heart of a dog, but the experiment could not be reproduced. In the mid-20th century, revascularization efforts continued. Beck C. S. used a carotid conduit to connect the descending aorta to the coronary sinus, the biggest vein of the heart. In the "Vineberg Procedure", Arthur Vineberg used skeletonized LITA, placing it in a small tunnel he created next to the LAD and hoping spontaneous collateral circulation would form. This occurred in canine experiments but not in humans. Goetz RH was the first to perform an anastomosis of the ITA to LAD in the 1960 using a sutureless technique.

The development of coronary angiography in 1962 by Mason Sones helped medical doctors to identify patients in need of operation, and which native heart vessels should be bypassed. In 1964, Soviet cardiac surgeon Vasilii Kolesov performed the first successful internal thoracic artery–coronary artery anastomosis, followed by Michael DeBakey in the United States. Argentine surgeon René Favaloro standardized the procedure. Their advances made CABG the standard of care of CAD patients.

=== The CABG era ===
The modern era of the CABG began in 1964 when Soviet cardiac surgeon Vasilii Kolesov performed the first successful internal thoracic artery–coronary artery anastomosis. The same year, American surgeon Michael DeBakey used a saphenous vein to create an aorta-coronary artery bypass. Argentinean surgeon René Favaloro advanced and standardized the CABG technique using the patient's saphenous vein.

The introduction of arresting the heart during operation (cardioplegia) made CABG much less risky. A major obstacle of CABG was ischemia and infarction occurring while the heart was stopped to allow surgeons to construct the distal anastomosis. In the 1970s, potassium-based cardioplegia was used. Cardioplegia minimized the oxygen demands of the heart, thus reducing the effects of ischemia. Refinement of cardioplegia in the 1980s made CABG less risky, lowering mortality during operation.

In the late 1960s, after the work of René Favaloro, the operation was performed in only a few centers, but was anticipated to more broadly change the outcome of coronary artery disease. By 1979, there were 114,000 procedures per year in the US. The introduction of percutaneous coronary intervention (PCI) did not obsolesce CABG; rates of both procedures continued to increase, but PCIs grew more rapidly. In the following decades, CABG was extensively studied and compared to PCI. The absence of a clear advantage of CABG over PCI led to a small decrease in numbers of CABGs in some countries (like the US) by 2000. In Europe—mainly Germany—CABG was increasingly performed. As of 2023, research comparing the two techniques is continuing. Meta-analysis published in 2023 suggests that CABG provides a consistent survival benefit over PCI with drug-eluting stents (DES).

Favaloro's work is fundamental to the history of graft selection. He established the use of bilateral ITAs as superior to vein grafts. Surgeons examined the use of other arterial grafts—splenic, gastroepiploic mesenteric, subscapular and others—but none matched the patency rates of ITA. In 1971, Alain Carpentier introduced the use of the radial artery, which was initially prone to failure, but the development of harvesting techniques in the following 20 years significantly improved patency.

== CABG In Animals ==
Pigs, sheep, and dogs have been used as experimental models, for the development of CABG. Performing CABG to treat a sick animal though is extremely rare.

== See also ==
- Angioplasty
- Cardiothoracic surgery
- Dressler's syndrome
- Totally endoscopic coronary artery bypass surgery

== Sources ==
- Al-Atassi, Talal; Toeg, Hadi D.; Chan, Vincent; Ruel, Marc (2016). "Coronary Artery Bypass Grafting". In Frank Sellke; Pedro J. del Nido (eds.). Sabiston and Spencer Surgery of the Chest. ISBN 978-0-323-24126-7.
- Bojar, R.M. (2021). Manual of Perioperative Care in Adult Cardiac Surgery. Wiley. ISBN 978-1-119-58255-7.
- Connolly, John E. (2001-03-25). "The Development of Coronary Artery Surgery: Personal Recollections". Texas Heart Institute Journal. 29 (1): 10–14. PMC 101261. PMID 11995842.
- Cordova, Melanie Greaver (2020-05-05). "Veterinarians, MDs team up for canine open-heart surgery". Cornell Chronicle.
- Farina, Piero; Gaudino, Mario Fulvio Luigi; Taggart, David Paul (2020). "The Eternal Debate With a Consistent Answer: CABG vs PCI". Seminars in Thoracic and Cardiovascular Surgery. 32 (1). Elsevier BV: 14–20. doi:10.1053/j.semtcvs.2019.08.009. ISSN 1043-0679. PMID 31442489. S2CID 201632303.
- Fearon, William F.; Zimmermann, Frederik M.; De Bruyne, Bernard; Piroth, Zsolt; van Straten, Albert H.M.; Szekely, Laszlo; Davidavičius, Giedrius; Kalinauskas, Gintaras; Mansour, Samer; Kharbanda, Rajesh; Östlund-Papadogeorgos, Nikolaos; Aminian, Adel; Oldroyd, Keith G.; Al-Attar, Nawwar; Jagic, Nikola; Dambrink, Jan-Henk E.; Kala, Petr; Angerås, Oskar; MacCarthy, Philip; Wendler, Olaf; Casselman, Filip; Witt, Nils; Mavromatis, Kreton; Miner, Steven E.S.; Sarma, Jaydeep; Engstrøm, Thomas; Christiansen, Evald H.; Tonino, Pim A.L.; Reardon, Michael J.; Lu, Di; Ding, Victoria Y.; Kobayashi, Yuhei; Hlatky, Mark A.; Mahaffey, Kenneth W.; Desai, Manisha; Woo, Y. Joseph; Yeung, Alan C.; Pijls, Nico H.J. (2022-01-13). "Fractional Flow Reserve–Guided PCI as Compared with Coronary Bypass Surgery". New England Journal of Medicine. 386 (2). Massachusetts Medical Society: 128–137. doi:10.1056/nejmoa2112299. ISSN 0028-4793. PMID 34735046. S2CID 242940936.
- Head, S. J.; Kieser, T. M.; Falk, V.; Huysmans, H. A.; Kappetein, A. P. (2013-10-01). "Coronary artery bypass grafting: Part 1—the evolution over the first 50 years". European Heart Journal. 34 (37). Oxford University Press (OUP): 2862–2872. doi:10.1093/eurheartj/eht330. ISSN 0195-668X. PMID 24086085.
- "Corrigendum to: 2018 ESC/EACTS Guidelines on myocardial revascularization". European Heart Journal. 40 (37): 3096. 2019-10-01. doi:10.1093/eurheartj/ehz507. ISSN 0195-668X. PMID 31292611.
- Smith, Peter K.; Schroder, Jacob N. (2016). "On-Pump Coronary Artery Bypass Grafting". In Josef E. Fischer (ed.). Master Techniques in Surgery CARDIAC SURGERY. Wolters Kluwer. ISBN 978-1-4511-9353-4.
- Kouchoukos, Nicholas; Blackstone, E. H.; Hanley, F. L.; Kirklin, J. K. (2013). Kirklin/Barratt-Boyes Cardiac Surgery E-Book (4th ed.). Elsevier. ISBN 978-1-4160-6391-9.
- Mick, Stephanie; Keshavamurthy, Suresh; Mihaljevicl, Tomislav; Bonatti, Johannes (2016). "Robotic and Alternative Approaches to Coronary Artery Bypass Grafting". In Frank Sellke; Pedro J. del Nido (eds.). Sabiston and Spencer Surgery of the Chest. pp. 1603–1615. ISBN 978-0-323-24126-7.
- Ngu, Janet M. C.; Sun, Louise Y.; Ruel, Marc (2018). "Pivotal contemporary trials of percutaneous coronary intervention vs. coronary artery bypass grafting: a surgical perspective". Annals of Cardiothoracic Surgery. 7 (4). AME Publishing Company: 527–532. doi:10.21037/acs.2018.05.12. ISSN 2225-319X. PMC 6082775. PMID 30094218.
- Welt, Frederick G.P. (2022-01-13). "CABG versus PCI — End of the Debate?". New England Journal of Medicine. 386 (2). Massachusetts Medical Society: 185–187. doi:10.1056/nejme2117325. ISSN 0028-4793. PMID 35020989. S2CID 245907473.
