= Tricuspid regurgitation =

Type of valvular heart disease

- Other names: Tricuspid insufficiency
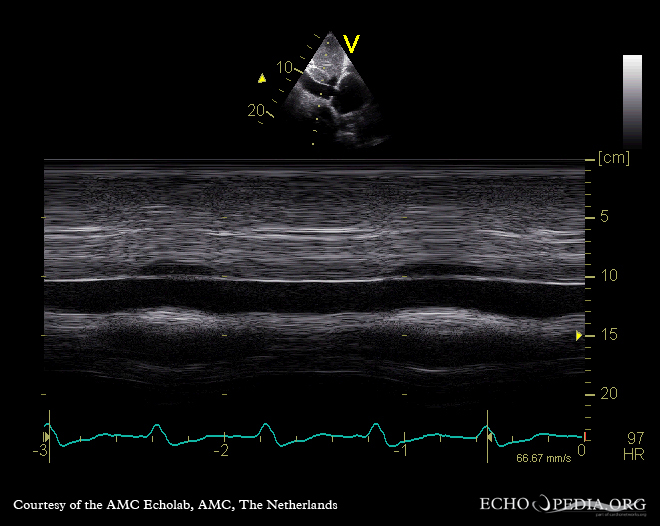
- Echocardiogram showing typical findings in severe tricuspid regurgitation
- Specialty: Cardiology
- Symptoms: Ascites
- Causes: Abnormally high blood pressure, other heart problem
- Diagnostic method: Echocardiogram
- Treatment: Diuretic, Surgery

Tricuspid regurgitation (TR), also called tricuspid insufficiency, is a type of valvular heart disease in which the tricuspid valve of the heart, located between the right atrium and right ventricle, does not close completely when the right ventricle contracts (systole). TR allows the blood to flow backwards from the right ventricle to the right atrium, which increases the volume and pressure of the blood both in the right atrium and the right ventricle, which may increase central venous volume and pressure if the backward flow is sufficiently severe.

The causes of TR are divided into hereditary and acquired; and also primary and secondary. Primary TR refers to a defect solely in the tricuspid valve, such as infective endocarditis; secondary TR refers to a defect in the valve as a consequence of some other pathology, such as left ventricular failure or pulmonary hypertension.

The mechanism of TR is either a dilatation of the base (annulus) of the valve due to right ventricular dilatation, which results in the three leaflets being too far apart to reach one another; or an abnormality of one or more of the three leaflets.

== Signs and symptoms ==
The symptoms of TR depend on its severity. Severe TR causes right-sided heart failure, with the development of ascites and peripheral edema. In severe cases of right heart failure due to TR, venous congestion of the kidneys and liver may lead to cardiorenal syndrome (kidney failure secondary to heart failure) and cardiohepatic syndromes (liver failure secondary to heart failure) respectively. Venous congestion from TR and right heart failure may also lead to anasarca (diffuse swelling) and decreased intestinal absorption due to the swelling surrounding the intestines, in severe cases this may lead to cachexia and malnutrition.

A pansystolic heart murmur may be heard on auscultation of the chest. The murmur is usually of low frequency and best heard on the lower left sternal border. It increases with inspiration, and decreases with expiration: this is known as Carvallo's sign. However, the murmur may be inaudible due to the relatively low pressures in the right side of the heart. A third heart sound may also be present, also heard at the lower sternal border, and increasing in intensity with inspiration.

On examination of the neck, there may be giant C-V waves in the jugular pulse. With severe TR, there may be an enlarged liver detected on palpation of the right upper quadrant of the abdomen; the liver may be pulsatile on palpation and even on inspection.

== Causes ==
The causes of TR may be classified as congenital or acquired; another classification divides the causes into primary or secondary. Congenital abnormalities are much less common than acquired. The most common acquired TR is due to right ventricular dilatation. Such dilatation is most often due left heart failure or pulmonary hypertension. Other causes of right ventricular dilatation include right ventricular infarction, inferior myocardial infarction, and cor pulmonale.

In regards to primary and secondary causes they are:

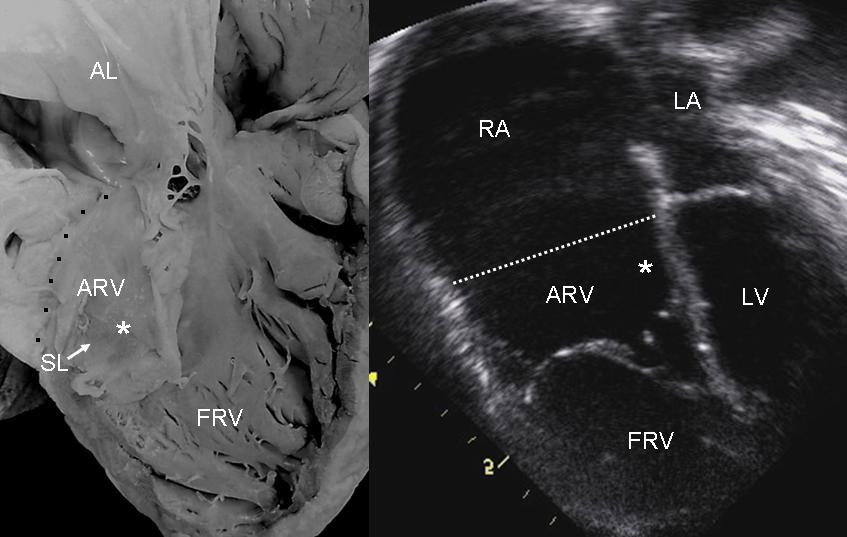
Pathological specimen and ultrasound image of a heart with Ebstein's anomaly

- Primary causes
  - Rheumatic
  - Myxomatous
  - Ebstein anomaly
  - Endomyocardial fibrosis
  - Endocarditis
  - Traumatic (blunt chest injury)
- Secondary causes
  - Left ventricular systolic dysfunction
  - Mitral valve stenosis or regurgitation
  - Chronic lung disease
  - Pulmonary thromboembolism
  - Myocardial disease
  - Right ventricular ischemia and infarction
  - Left to right shunt
  - Carcinoid heart disease

== Mechanism ==
In terms of the mechanism of tricuspid insufficiency, it involves the expansion of the tricuspid annulus (fibrous rings of heart). Tricuspid insufficiency is linked to geometric changes of the tricuspid annulus (decreased tricuspid annular release). The leaflets shape are normal but prevented from normal working mechanism due to a distortion of spatial relationships of leaflets and chords. It is also contemplated that the process via which tricuspid regurgitation emerges, is a decrease of contraction of the myocardium around the annulus.

== Diagnosis ==
The diagnosis of TR may be suspected if the typical murmur of TR is heard or other signs suggestive of right heart failure.

Definitive diagnosis is made by echocardiogram, which is capable of measuring both the presence and the severity of the TR, as well as right ventricular dimensions and systolic pressures. Cardiac MRI or CT scan may also aid in the diagnosis of TR. On imaging studies, a regurgitant volume greater than 45 milliliters or greater than 50% regurgitation across the tricuspid valve is associated with poor outcomes.

== Management ==
=== Medical ===
Medical therapy for tricuspid regurgitation consists of diuretics (loop diuretics as the first line therapy with mineralocorticoid receptor antagonists added on for worsening or refractory cases). However, as the disease progresses, diuretics may become inefficient. Diuretic resistance in TR and right heart failure is thought to develop due to a variety of mechanisms working synergistically to lead to decreased effectiveness of diuretics. Decreased effective circulating volume, ie. decreased blood perfusing the kidneys, leads to activation of the renin–angiotensin–aldosterone system, which leads to the kidneys reabsorbing salt and water and vasoconstriction of the arterioles. Intestinal edema may also lead to decreased gut absorption of the diuretics and increased fluid retention may lead to an increased volume of distribution of the diuretic. All of the preceding mechanisms in TR with right heart failure (and sometimes secondary left heart failure) lead to diuretic resistance. Diuretic resistance is associated with a poor prognosis.

=== Surgical ===
Indications for surgical fixation of tricuspidal issues include organic lesion(s) in the valve or severe functional regurgitation. During open heart surgery for another issue (e.g. mitral valve), fixing the tricuspid valve may be considered, but medical consensus is unclear. Some argue that even mild to moderate tricuspid regurgitation should be addressed, while others take a more conservative approach. Infective endocarditis or traumatic lesions are other indications.

Surgical options include annuloplasty or replacement of the valve. Adding a rigid prosthetic ring aims to decrease the diameter of the valve and stabilize it. Another annuloplasty modality is the "De Vega technique", in which the valve diameter is decreased by two sutures placed around the periphery of the valve. In cases of severe organic lesions of the valve, such as endocarditis, the valve may be excised. Tricuspid valve replacement with either a mechanical valve or a bioprosthesis may be indicated depending on the patient. Mechanical prostheses can cause thromboembolic phenomena, while bioprostheses may degenerate with use. Some evidence suggests that there is no significant difference between the survival rates of recipients of mechanical versus biological tricuspid valves.

When controlled for severity of TR, tricuspid valve surgery performed on TR patients as considered appropriate is associated with improved outcomes (Hazard ratio= .74).

== Prognosis ==
The prognosis of TR is less favorable for females than males. Females are at a greater risk of progressing to severe TR as compared to males. Survival rates are proportional to TR severity; but even mild TR reduces survival compared to those with no TR. In some studies, the 1 year mortality rate of severe, medically treated TR is 36-42% with a 2-3.2 times increased risk of death in moderate or severe TR as compared to mild TR or no tricuspid valvular disease. Even in those with mild TR, a large population based study showed about a 29% greater risk of death as compared to healthy controls.

== Epidemiology ==
In The Framingham Heart Study, presence of tricuspid regurgitation of mild severity or greater, was present in about 14.8% of men and 18.4% of women. Mild tricuspid regurgitation tends to be common and, in the presence of a structurally normal tricuspid valve apparatus, can be considered a normal variant. Clinically significant TR is more common in females, this is thought to be partly driven by the increased prevalence of atrial fibrillation and heart failure with preserved ejection fraction (both risk factors for TR) in women as compared to men. Moderate or severe tricuspid regurgitation is usually associated with tricuspid valve leaflet abnormalities and/or possibly annular dilation and is usually pathologic which can lead to irreversible damage of cardiac muscle and worse outcomes due to chronic prolonged right ventricular volume overload.

In a study of 595 male elite football players aged 18–38, and 47 sedentary non-athletes, it was found that 58% of the athletes had tricuspid regurgitation vs. 36% in non-athletes. Football players with tricuspid regurgitation had larger tricuspid annulus diameter, compared to athletes without tricuspid regurgitation. Athletes with tricuspid regurgitation also had enlarged right atrium diameter when compared to control group.

== See also ==
- Heart valves

== Sources ==
- Mestres, Carlos A.; Bernal, Jose M.; Pomar, Jose L. (2016). "Surgical Treatment of Tricuspid Valve Diseases". In Frank Sellke; Pedro J. del Nido (eds.). Sabiston and Spencer Surgery of the Chest. Elsevier. ISBN 978-0-323-24126-7.
