= Interventricular sulcus =

Interventricular sulcus may refer to:

- Posterior interventricular sulcus, one of the two grooves that separates the ventricles of the heart, near the right margin
- Anterior interventricular sulcus, one of two grooves that separates the ventricles of the heart, never the left margin
