= Anterior longitudinal =

Anterior longitudinal may refer to:

- Anterior interventricular sulcus
- Anterior longitudinal ligament
