= Cardiomyopathy =

Disease of the heart muscle

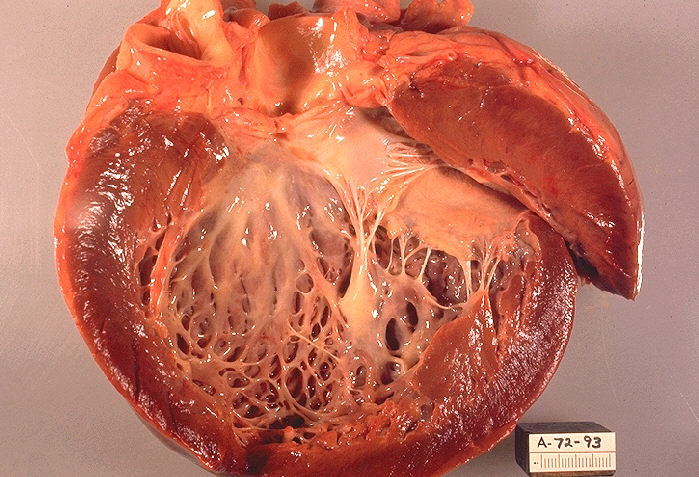
- Opened left ventricle showing thickening, dilatation, and subendocardial fibrosis noticeable as increased whiteness of the inside of the heart.
- Specialty: Cardiology
- Symptoms: Shortness of breath; Feeling tired; Swelling of the legs
- Complications: Heart failure; Irregular heart beat; Sudden cardiac death
- Types: Hypertrophic cardiomyopathy; Dilated cardiomyopathy; Restrictive cardiomyopathy; Arrhythmogenic right ventricular dysplasia; Takotsubo cardiomyopathy
- Causes: Unknown; Genetic; Heavy alcohol use; Tobacco smoking; Heavy metals; Amyloidosis; Stress
- Treatment: Depends on type and symptoms
- Frequency: 2.5 million with myocarditis (2015)
- Deaths: 354,000 with myocarditis (2015)

Cardiomyopathy is a group of primary diseases of the heart muscle. Early on there may be few or no symptoms. As the disease worsens, shortness of breath, feeling tired, and swelling of the legs may occur, due to the onset of heart failure. An irregular heart beat and fainting may occur. Those affected are at an increased risk of sudden cardiac death.

As of 2013, cardiomyopathies are defined as "disorders characterized by morphologically and functionally abnormal myocardium in the absence of any other disease that is sufficient, by itself, to cause the observed phenotype." Types of cardiomyopathy include hypertrophic cardiomyopathy, dilated cardiomyopathy, restrictive cardiomyopathy, arrhythmogenic right ventricular dysplasia, and Takotsubo cardiomyopathy (broken heart syndrome). In hypertrophic cardiomyopathy the heart muscle enlarges and thickens. In dilated cardiomyopathy the ventricles enlarge and weaken. In restrictive cardiomyopathy the ventricle stiffens.

In many cases, the cause cannot be determined. Hypertrophic cardiomyopathy is usually inherited, whereas dilated cardiomyopathy is inherited in about one third of cases. Dilated cardiomyopathy may also result from alcohol, heavy metals, coronary artery disease, cocaine abuse, and viral infections. Restrictive cardiomyopathy may be caused by amyloidosis, hemochromatosis, and some cancer treatments. Broken heart syndrome is caused by extreme emotional or physical stress.

Treatment depends on the type of cardiomyopathy and the severity of symptoms. Treatments may include lifestyle changes, medications, or surgery. Surgery may include a ventricular assist device or heart transplant. In 2015 cardiomyopathy and myocarditis affected 2.5 million people. In a recent nationwide study of cardiomyopathies between 2004 and 2023, the overall prevalence more than doubled over the two decades, with an age-standardized prevalence of 5 in 1,000 in men, and 3 in 1,000 women in 2023. Dilated cardiomyopathy was the most common subtype (3 in 1,000 for men, 1 in 1,000 in women), followed by hypertrophic cardiomyopathy (about 1 in 1,000 for men, 0.5 in 1,000 for women). In this investigation, cardiomyopathies were associated with a substantial excess mortality compared with the general population, ranging from a 32-fold and 16-fold increase in the youngest men and women with cardiomyopathies, to a two-fold increase in the oldest patients.

== Signs and symptoms ==
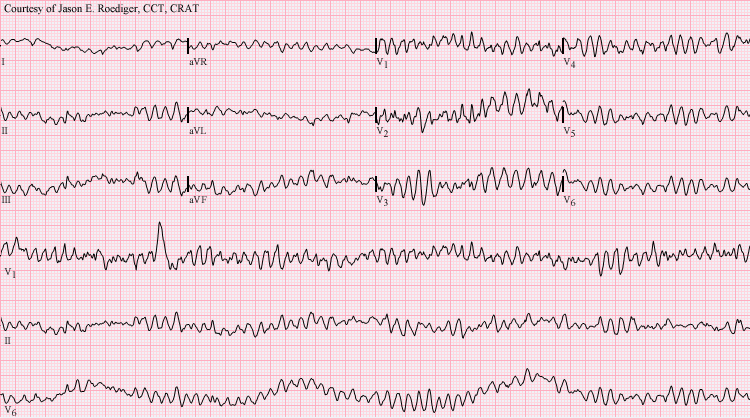
The arrhythmia, ventricular fibrillation, seen on an ECG

The presentation of cardiomyopathy is:

- Shortness of breath or trouble breathing, especially with physical exertion
- Fatigue
- Swelling in the ankles, feet, legs, abdomen and veins in the neck
- Dizziness
- Lightheadedness
- Fainting during physical activity
- Arrhythmias (abnormal heartbeats)
- Chest pain, especially after physical exertion or heavy meals
- Heart murmurs (unusual sounds associated with heartbeats)

== Causes ==
Cardiomyopathies can be of genetic (familial) or non-genetic (acquired) origin. Genetic cardiomyopathies usually are caused by sarcomere or cytoskeletal diseases, neuromuscular disorders, inborn errors of metabolism, malformation syndromes and sometimes are unidentified. Non-genetic cardiomyopathies can have definitive causes such as viral infections, myocarditis and others.

Cardiomyopathies are either confined to the heart or are part of a generalized systemic disorder, both often leading to cardiovascular death or progressive heart failure-related disability. Other diseases that cause heart muscle dysfunction are excluded, such as coronary artery disease, hypertension, or abnormalities of the heart valves. Often, the underlying cause remains unknown, but in many cases the cause may be identifiable. Alcoholism, for example, has been identified as a cause of dilated cardiomyopathy, as has drug toxicity, and certain infections (including Hepatitis C). Untreated celiac disease can cause cardiomyopathies, which can completely reverse with a timely diagnosis. In addition to acquired causes, molecular biology and genetics have given rise to the recognition of various genetic causes.

A more clinical categorization of cardiomyopathy as 'hypertrophied', 'dilated', or 'restrictive', has become difficult to maintain because some of the conditions could fulfill more than one of those three categories at any particular stage of their development.The current American Heart Association (AHA) definition divides cardiomyopathies into primary, which affect the heart alone, and secondary, which are the result of illness affecting other parts of the body. These categories are further broken down into subgroups which incorporate new genetic and molecular biology knowledge.

== Mechanism ==
The pathophysiology of cardiomyopathies is better understood at the cellular level with advances in molecular techniques. Mutant proteins can disturb cardiac function in the contractile apparatus (or mechanosensitive complexes). Cardiomyocyte alterations and their persistent responses at the cellular level cause changes that are correlated with sudden cardiac death and other cardiac problems.

Cardiomyopathies are generally varied individually. Different factors can cause cardiomyopathies in adults as well as children. For example, dilated cardiomyopathy in adults is associated with ischemic cardiomyopathy, hypertension, valvular diseases, and genetics. In children, neuromuscular diseases such as Becker muscular dystrophy or X-linked genetic disorder, are directly linked with cardiomyopathies.

== Diagnosis ==
Normal sinus rhythm on EKG

Among the diagnostic procedures done to determine a cardiomyopathy are:

- Physical exam
- Family history
- Blood test
- ECG
- Echocardiogram
- Stress test
- Genetic testing

=== Classification ===
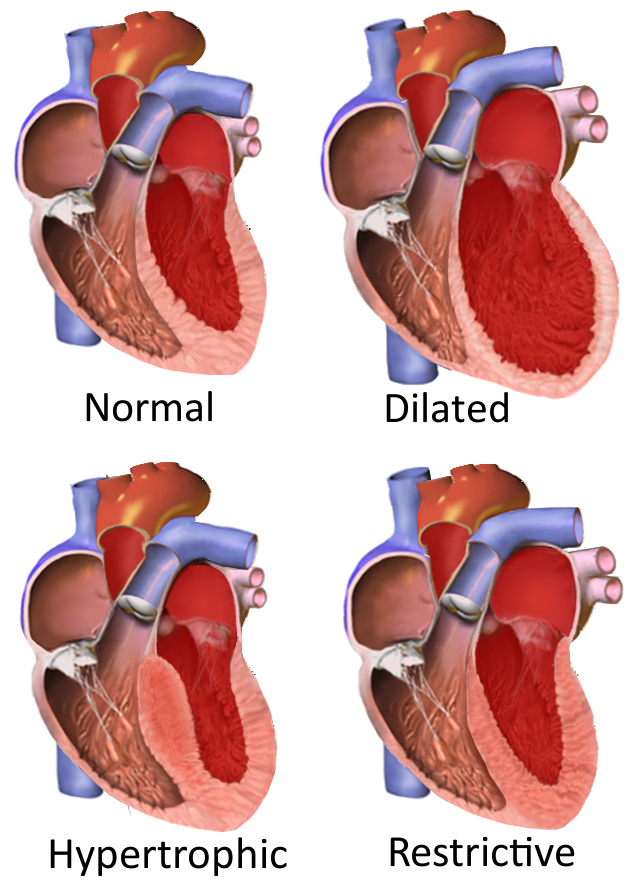
Structural categories of cardiomyopathy

Stained microscopic section of heart muscle in hypertrophic cardiomyopathy

Cardiomyopathies can be classified using different criteria:

- Primary/intrinsic cardiomyopathies
  - Congenital
    - Hypertrophic cardiomyopathy (HCM)
    - Arrhythmogenic right ventricular cardiomyopathy (ARVC)
    - Left ventricular noncompaction
    - Ion Channelopathies like the Long QT syndrome and the very rare Short QT syndrome
    - Catecholaminergic polymorphic ventricular tachycardia
  - Mixed
    - Dilated cardiomyopathy (DCM)
    - Restrictive cardiomyopathy (RCM)
    - Brugada syndrome
  - Acquired
    - Stress cardiomyopathy
    - Myocarditis, inflammation of and injury to heart tissue due in part to its infiltration by lymphocytes and monocytes
    - Eosinophilic myocarditis, inflammation of and injury to heart tissue due in part to its infiltration by eosinophils
    - Ischemic cardiomyopathy (not formally included in the classification, due to ischemic cardiomyopathy being a direct result of another cardiac problem)
- Secondary/extrinsic cardiomyopathies
  - Metabolic/storage
    - Fabry's disease
    - Hemochromatosis
  - Endomyocardial
    - Endomyocardial fibrosis
    - Hypereosinophilic syndrome
  - Endocrine
    - Diabetes mellitus
    - Hyperthyroidism
    - Acromegaly
  - Cardiofacial
    - Noonan syndrome
  - Neuromuscular
    - Muscular dystrophy
    - Friedreich's ataxia
  - Other
    - Obesity-associated cardiomyopathy

== Treatment ==
Treatment may include suggestion of lifestyle changes to better manage the condition. Treatment depends on the type of cardiomyopathy and condition of disease, but may include medication (conservative treatment) or iatrogenic/implanted pacemakers for slow heart rates, defibrillators for those prone to fatal heart rhythms, ventricular assist devices (VADs) for severe heart failure, or catheter ablation for recurring dysrhythmias that cannot be eliminated by medication or mechanical cardioversion. The goal of treatment is often symptom relief, and some patients may eventually require a heart transplant.Acoramidis (Attruby) was approved for medical use in the United States in November 2024, to treat adults with cardiomyopathy of wild-type or variant (hereditary) transthyretin-mediated amyloidosis (ATTR-CM) to reduce death and hospitalization related to heart problems.

== See also ==
- Basic Research in Cardiology (journal)
- Myopathy
