= Thomas Thum =

German cardiologist and entrepreneur

Thomas Thum (born 16 November 1974 in Hildesheim) is a German cardiologist, scientist and entrepreneur who specialises in the pathophysiological role of ribonucleic acid (RNA), organ fibrosis and cardiovascular and pulmonary diseases.

== Academic career ==
Thum studied medicine at Hannover Medical School from 1994 to 2001. He also obtained his doctorate there in 2001. He then completed a second doctorate at the National Heart and Lung Institute at Imperial College London under Philip Poole-Wilson.

In 2009, he became head of the Institut für Molekulare und Translationale Therapiestrategien (Institute for Molecular and Translational Therapy Strategies, IMTTS) at Hannover Medical School, where he also holds a professorship. Since 2013, he has been a visiting professor at Imperial College London's National Heart and Lung Institute. From 2021 to 2023, he headed the Fraunhofer-Institut für Toxikologie und Experimentelle Medizin (Fraunhofer Institute for Toxicology and Experimental Medicine, ITEM) in Hanover.

Thum's scientific work focuses mainly on the development of RNA-based therapeutics for cardiovascular diseases. He has published over 500 scientific articles (as of April 2025) and filed over 45 patents, several of which are in clinical development (as of April 2021).

== Business activities ==
In 2016, Thum founded Cardior Pharmaceuticals GmbH, a biotechnology company focussing on RNA-based therapeutics for heart failure. Under his leadership, it raised around 80 million euros in several rounds of financing and conducted the world's first studies with an oligonucleotide-based microRNA therapy in patients with heart failure. In May 2024, Novo Nordisk acquired Cardior Pharmaceuticals for more than 1 billion euro.

== Research contributions and impact ==
Thum "is recognised as one of the leading experts in the study of RNA molecules and their role in cardiovascular disease." He is considered the author of important studies on oligonucleotide-based therapies, particularly with regard to the targeted treatment of cardiac fibrosis with microRNA-21 inhibitors. His team also identified the miRNA-212/132 cluster, which plays a key role in cardiomegaly and autophagy, thus enabling potential therapeutic applications in heart failure.

Thum's recent research has focused on cardiovascular long non-coding RNAs (lncRNAs) and circular RNAs (circRNAs), which have potential as diagnostic and prognostic markers and as customised therapeutic targets for heart disease and other conditions.

== Awards and honours ==
Over the course of his career, Thum has received numerous prestigious awards, including the 2021 Paul Martini Prize, the 2022 Desmond Julian Prize and the 2014 Sir Hans Krebs Prize.

== Writings (selection) ==
- Täubel J; Hauke W; Thum T; et al. (2021), "Novel antisense therapy targeting microRNA-132 in patients with heart failure: results of a first-in-human Phase 1b randomized, double-blind, placebo-controlled study", European Heart Journal, vol. 42, no. 2, pp. 178–188, doi:10.1093/eurheartj/ehaa898, PMC 7954267, PMID 33245749
- Foinquinos A; Batkai S; Thum T; et al. (2020), "Preclinical development of a miR-132 inhibitor for heart failure treatment", Nature Communications, vol. 11, no. 11, p. 633, Bibcode:2020NatCo..11..633F, doi:10.1038/s41467-020-14349-2, PMC 6994493, PMID 32005803
- Viereck J; Bührke A; Thum T; et al. (2020), "Targeting muscle-enriched long non-coding RNA H19 reverses pathological cardiac hypertrophy", European Heart Journal, vol. 41, no. 36, pp. 3462–3474, doi:10.1093/eurheartj/ehaa519, PMC 8482849, PMID 32657324
- Schimmel K; Jung M; Thum T; et al. (2020), "Natural Compound Library Screening Identifies New Molecules for the Treatment of Cardiac Fibrosis and Diastolic Dysfunction", Circulation, vol. 141, no. 9, pp. 751–767, doi:10.1161/CIRCULATIONAHA.119.042559, PMC 7050799, PMID 31948273
- Kreutzer FP; Meinecke A; Thum T; et al. (2022), "Development and characterization of anti-fibrotic natural compound similars with improved effectivity", Basic Research in Cardiology, vol. 117, no. 117, p. 9, doi:10.1007/s00395-022-00919-6, PMC 8891108, PMID 35235052
- Piccoli M-T; Gupta SK; Thum T; et al. (2017), "Inhibition of the Cardiac Fibroblast-Enriched lncRNA Meg3 Prevents Cardiac Fibrosis and Diastolic Dysfunction", Circulation Research, vol. 121, no. 5, pp. 575–583, doi:10.1161/CIRCRESAHA.117.310624, PMID 28630135
- Viereck J; Kumarswamy R; Thum T; et al. (2016), "Long noncoding RNA Chast promotes cardiac remodeling", Science Translational Medicine, vol. 8, no. 326, pp. 326ra22, doi:10.1126/scitranslmed.aaf1475, PMID 26888430
- Ucar A; Gupta SK; Thum T; et al. (2012), "The miRNA-212/132 family regulates both cardiac hypertrophy and cardiomyocyte autophagy", Nature Communications, vol. 3, no. 3, p. 1078, Bibcode:2012NatCo...3.1078U, doi:10.1038/ncomms2090, PMC 3657998, PMID 23011132
- Ucar A; Vafaizadeh V; Thum T; et al. (2010), "miR-212 and miR-132 are required for epithelial stromal interactions necessary for mouse mammary gland development", Nature Genetics, vol. 42, no. 12, pp. 1101–1108, doi:10.1038/ng.709, hdl:11858/00-001M-0000-0012-D4CA-2, PMID 21057503
- Thum T; Gross C; Fiedler J; et al. (2008), "MicroRNA-21 contributes to myocardial disease by stimulating MAP kinase signalling in fibroblasts", Nature, vol. 456, no. 7224, pp. 980–984, Bibcode:2008Natur.456..980T, doi:10.1038/nature07511, PMID 19043405
