= Notch of cardiac apex =

Notch in the heart

Details

Identifiers
- Latin: Incisura apicis cordis
- TA98: A12.1.00.008
- TA2: 3942
- FMA: 75133

The anterior interventricular sulcus and posterior interventricular sulcus extend from the base of the ventricular portion to a notch, the notch of cardiac apex, (or incisura apicis cordis) on the acute margin of the heart just to the right of the apex.
