= Interventricular groove =

Interventricular groove may refer to:

- Anterior interventricular sulcus, one of two grooves that separates the ventricles of the heart, near the left margin
- Posterior interventricular sulcus, one of the two grooves that separates the ventricles of the heart, near the right margin
