= Anterior interventricular =

Anterior interventricular may refer to:

- Anterior interventricular sulcus
- Anterior interventricular branch of left coronary artery
