= Posterior interventricular =

Posterior interventricular may refer to:

- Posterior interventricular artery
- Posterior interventricular sulcus
