= Thoralf M. Sundt, III =

Cardiac surgeon

Thoralf “Thor” Mauritz Sundt, III is an American cardiac surgeon who was the 97th president of the American Association for Thoracic Surgery (AATS), succeeding Joseph S. Coselli and preceding Duke Cameron.

Sundt is the chief of cardiac surgery at Massachusetts General Hospital and director of their Corrigan Minehan Heart Center. He is also the Edward D. Churchill Professor of Surgery at Harvard Medical School.

== Biography ==
Sundt was born on October 14, 1957, in Memphis, Tennessee. When he was 12, he and his family moved to Rochester, Minnesota, when his father became chief of neurosurgery at the Mayo Clinic. He went to Princeton University for his undergraduate degree in biochemistry.

He received his medical degree from Johns Hopkins School of Medicine.
