= Vasilii Kolesov =

Russian surgeon (1904–1992)

- Born: Vasilii Ivanovich Kolesov; September 24, 1904; Martyanovskaya village, Vologda Oblast, Russian Empire
- Died: August 2, 1992 (aged 87); Saint Petersburg, Russia
- Education: Leningrad Institute of Postgraduate Medical Studies
- Awards: USSR State Prize
- Scientific career
- Fields: Cardiac surgery
- Workplaces: Perm Medical Institute; S.M. Kirov Military Medical Academy; First Academician I.P. Pavlov Leningrad Medical Institute

Vasilii Ivanovich Kolesov (Russian: Василий Иванович Колесов; 24 September 1904 – 2 August 1992) was one of the pioneers of global cardiac surgery. He was the first to perform successful internal coronary artery bypass surgery using mammary artery–coronary artery anastomosis in 1964. Also in 1964, he performed the first successful coronary bypass using a standard suture technique. Kolesov was a recipient of the USSR State Prize and Honoured Worker of Science of the RSFSR (1964).

== Early life and education ==
Kolesov was born in Martyanovskaya village, Vologda Oblast of the Russian Empire. In 1927, he was admitted to the State Institute of Medical Knowledge (now Saint Petersburg State Medical Academy) and completed its medical program. During his time at the university, he was a member of the student biology society, which at the time was headed by Pyotr Ivanov. In 1931, fresh from a university, Kolesov went to Chusovoy. Three years later, he was admitted to surgery ward of the Perm Medical Institute, becoming an assisting physician under Vasily Parin. After receiving master's degree in surgery from the Leningrad Institute of Postgraduate Medical Studies in 1938, Kolesov then defended his thesis "On Eventration of Spleen Into the Abdominal Wound", obtaining for it a PhD.

== War ==
As a surgeon during the Siege of Leningrad, Kolesov was responsible for the treatment of countless war casualties, majority of wounded soldiers which suffered from coronary artery disease. And, perhaps, it was during this very siege where Kolesov learned about coronary artery bypass surgery, which he later performed on 25 February 1964 at the Department of Surgery of the 1st Leningrad Medical Institute.

== Career ==
After the war, Kolesov was offered a position by Pyotr Kupriyanov at the S. M. Kirov Military Medical Academy. After a year of service there and obtaining of PhD for writing a dissertation on bacteriological control and septic wound treatment with bacteriophage, he left for Austria. In 1949, Kolesov became head of the surgery service of the Central Army Group and then served as chief of the battlefield surgery department in Kharkiv. In 1955, he became head of the Faculty Surgery Clinic of the First Academician I.P. Pavlov Leningrad Medical Institute. It was there that Kolesov's teaching and research talents became obvious and he performed the first coronary artery bypass surgery on 25 February 1964, which made it possible to refer to him as the coronary surgery pioneer.

Kolesov was a member of the Pirogov Surgical Society and became an author of a book in 1966.
