= Joseph S. Coselli =

American cardiothoracic surgeon

Joseph S. Coselli FACS
- Born: October 28, 1952 (age 73); Houston, Texas
- Occupation: Cardiothoracic surgeon
- Relatives: Doris L. Coselli (mother), John A. Coselli (father)
- Medical career
- Profession: Professor, Executive Vice Chair (in the Department of Surgery), The Cullen Foundation Endowed Chair
- Institutions: Baylor College of Medicine

Joseph S. Coselli is an American cardiothoracic surgeon who was the 96th president of the American Association for Thoracic Surgery (AATS), succeeding Pedro J. del Nido and preceding Thoralf M. Sundt, III. Coselli is a Professor and Executive Vice Chair in the Department of Surgery and the Cullen Foundation Endowed Chair at the Baylor College of Medicine.

== Early life and education ==
Coselli was born in Houston, Texas, on October 28, 1952, to Doris L. and John A. Coselli, an attorney. He was educated at George W. Strake Jesuit High School and the University of Notre Dame (1970–74), gaining a bachelor's degree in biology. He did his medical training at University of Texas Medical School (1974–77), receiving his MD in 1977, and then gained experience under E. Stanley Crawford. He did a General Surgery Residency (1977) and Thoracic Surgery Residency (1982), both at Baylor College of Medicine Affiliate Hospitals.

== Career ==
Coselli has remained at the Baylor College of Medicine, rising to professor and chief of the division of cardiothoracic surgery. He served as president of the American Association for Thoracic Surgery (2016).

== Personal life ==
Coselli is married to Kelly and they have a daughter and a son.

== Publications ==
Co-edited books

- Aortic Arch Surgery: Principles, Strategies and Outcomes (Wiley–Blackwell)

Research papers

- Outcomes of 3309 Thoracoabdominal Aortic Aneurysm Repairs. The Journal of Thoracic and Cardiovascular Surgery (2016)
