= Coronary sulcus =

Groove on the surface of the heart that separates the atria from the ventricles

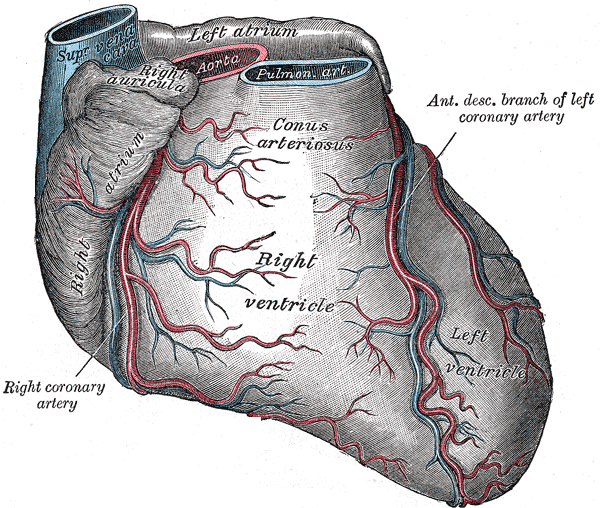

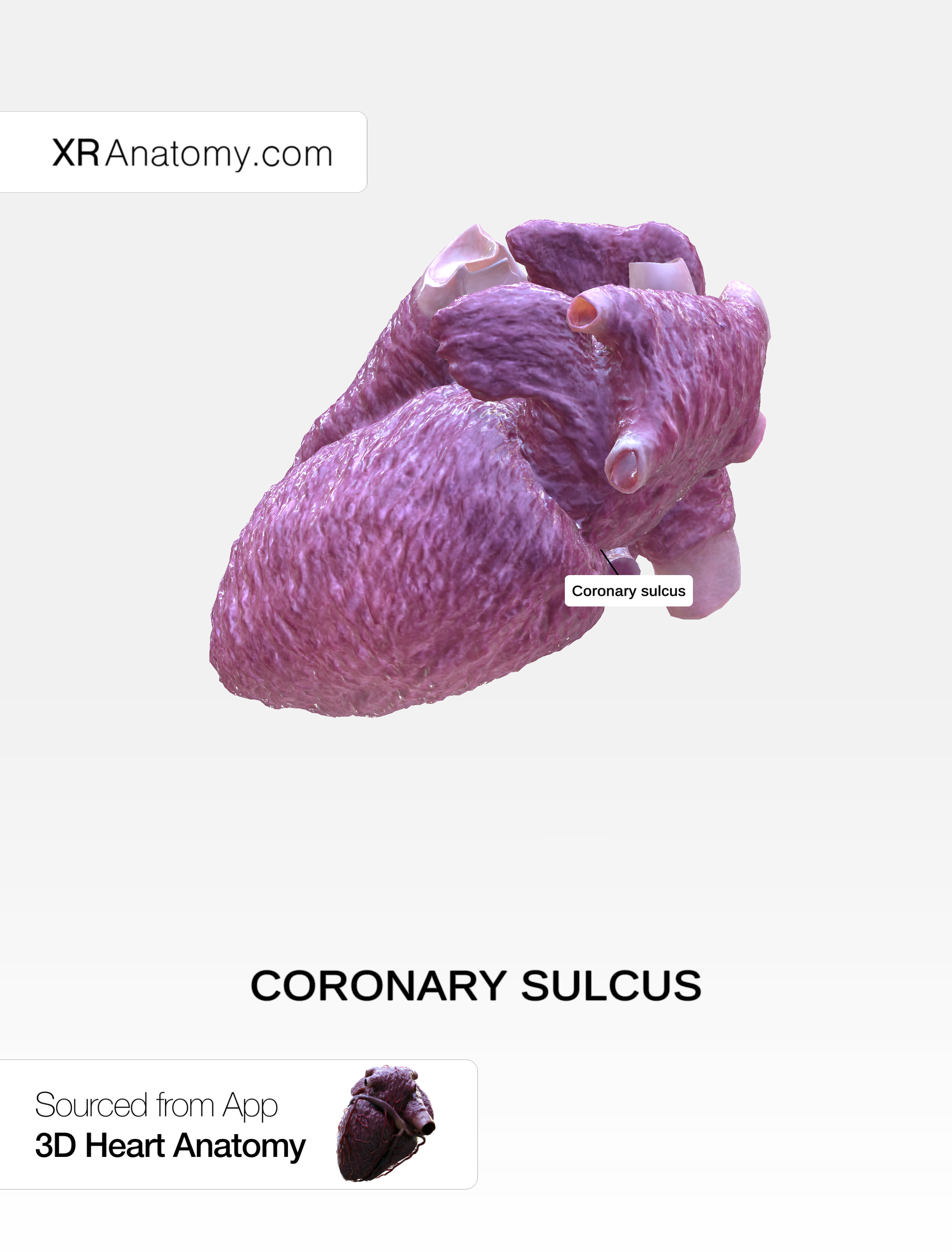

Details

Identifiers
- Latin: sulcus coronarius
- TA98: A12.1.00.011
- TA2: 3945
- FMA: 7174

The coronary sulcus (also called coronary groove, auriculoventricular groove, atrioventricular groove, AV groove) is a groove on the surface of the heart at the base of right auricle that separates the atria from the ventricles. The structure contains the trunks of the nutrient vessels of the heart, and is deficient in front, where it is crossed by the root of the pulmonary trunk. On the posterior surface of the heart, the coronary sulcus contains the coronary sinus. The right coronary artery, circumflex branch of left coronary artery, and small cardiac vein all travel along parts of the coronary sulcus.

== Structure ==
In relation to the rib cage, the coronary sulcus spans from the medial side of the 3rd left costal cartilage, to the middle of the right 6th costal cartilage. Epicardial fat tends to be concentrated along the coronary sulcus.

There are two coronary sulci in the heart, including left and right coronary sulci.

=== Left coronary sulcus ===
The left coronary sulcus originates posterior to the pulmonary trunk, and travels inferiorly separating the left atrium and left ventricle. The location of the left coronary sulcus is marked by the circumflex branch of left coronary artery, and coronary sinus.

=== Right coronary sulcus ===
The right coronary sulcus begins anteriorly and superiorly on the sternocostal surface of the heart. Its position is marked by the location of the right coronary artery, and small cardiac vein. The right coronary sulcus separates the right atrium and its atrial appendage from the right ventricle inferiorly. The right coronary sulcus then passes inferiorly onto the diaphragmatic surface of the heart and traverses to the left.

== Clinical significance ==
The left coronary sulcus is often neglected in echocardiography. As a result, normal variations and rare pathologic findings can be missed.

== See also ==
- Posterior interventricular sulcus
- Anterior interventricular sulcus
