= Crista supraventricularis =

Muscular ridge within the heart

Crista supraventricularis, also supraventricular crest, is a muscular ridge within the right ventricle of the heart. It is located between the tricuspid and pulmonic valves, at the junction of the right ventricular anterior (free) wall and the interventricular septum. It has a "U-shaped" morphology, which serves as a "trough" for the proximal right coronary artery.

Relationship to adjacent structures:

- cups the right coronary artery sinus of the aorta
- directly inferior to anterior leaflet of the tricuspid valve
