= Frank Sellke =

American cardiothoracic surgeon

Frank William Sellke
- Education: Wabash College; Indiana University School of Medicine; University of Iowa Hospitals and Clinics
- Medical career
- Profession: Surgeon
- Field: Cardiothoracic surgery
- Research: Coronary microcirculation, myocardial ischemia, outcomes in cardiac surgery

Frank William Sellke is an American cardiothoracic surgeon, academic, and researcher. He was the Johnson & Johnson Professor of Surgery at Harvard Medical School from 2000 to 2008, and the Karl Karlson and Gloria Karlson Professor of Cardiothoracic Surgery at the Warren Alpert Medical School of Brown University from 2008 to 2024.

== Education ==
Sellke received a B.A. in chemistry from Wabash College in 1978 and an M.D. from the Indiana University School of Medicine in 1981. He trained in cardiothoracic surgery at the University of Iowa Hospitals and Clinics from 1987 to 1990.

== Career ==
Sellke joined the Harvard Medical School faculty in 1990 and later held the Johnson & Johnson Professorship of Surgery. From 2000 to 2008, he served as Chief of Cardiothoracic Surgery at Beth Israel Deaconess Medical Center.

In 2008, he was named Chief of Cardiothoracic Surgery at Rhode Island Hospital and The Miriam Hospital and appointed the Karl Karlson and Gloria Karlson Professor of Cardiothoracic Surgery at the Warren Alpert Medical School of Brown University.

Sellke is known for his research on microvascular reactivity and permeability after cardiac surgery, collateral vessel formation in chronic heart disease, and perioperative outcomes including atrial fibrillation, neurocognitive changes, and bleeding. He has published over 660 peer-reviewed articles on coronary microcirculation, myocardial ischemia, ischemic injury, and outcomes in cardiac surgery, and has edited multiple cardiothoracic surgery textbooks, including the 7th to 10th editions of Sabiston & Spencer’s Surgery of the Chest, the 1st to 3rd editions of the Atlas of Cardiac Surgical Techniques, and Aortic Dissection and Acute Aortic Syndromes. Sellke is the recipient of the Distinguished Alumni Award from the Indiana University School of Medicine (2013) and the Distinguished Achievement Award from the American Heart Association (2013). He served as an associate editor of The Journal of Thoracic and Cardiovascular Surgery, Surgery, Circulation Heart Failure and the Circulation Journal, and as an editorial board member for other journals, including Circulation, Basic Research in Cardiology, Canadian Journal of Cardiology, and Journal of Cardiac Surgery.
