= Pedro J. del Nido =

Chilean pediatric cardiac surgeon

Pedro J. del Nido is a Chilean pediatric cardiac surgeon who was the 95th president of the American Association for Thoracic Surgery (AATS), succeeding David J. Sugarbaker and preceding Joseph S. Coselli.

== Education ==
Del Nido completed medical school at University of Wisconsin Medical School, 1977, Madison, Wisconsin, his residency in General Surgery at Boston University 1982, Boston, Massachusetts, Residency in Cardiothoracic Surgery at Toronto General Hospital 1985, Toronto, Canada, and Fellowship in Pediatric Cardiothoracic Surgery at Hospital for Sick Children, 1986, Toronto, Canada.

== Cardioplegia ==
Del Nido is the eponym of the del Nido cardioplegia, a solution infused during open-heart surgery to temporarily stop the heart from beating, known as cardioplegic cardiac arrest. Del Nido developed the solution while working at the University of Pittsburgh in the early 1990s, for which he subsequently received his first National Institutes of Health grant in 1992. Del Nido cardioplegia has been in use for 28 years at Boston Children's Hospital. While the del Nido cardioplegia was initially developed for use in pediatric patients, its use has gained popularity in adult cardiac surgery.

=== Composition of del Nido cardioplegia ===
Del Nido cardioplegia is a unique four-part crystalloid to one-part blood formulation that is typically dosed only one time. It consists of a base solution of Plasma-lyte A, which has an electrolyte composition similar to that of extracellular fluid. To one liter of Plasma-lyte A, the following are added to make the crystalloid component of del Nido cardioplegia:

- Mannitol 20%, 16.3 mL
- Magnesium sulfate 50%, 4 mL
- Sodium bicarbonate 8.4%, 13 mL
- Potassium chloride (2 mEq/mL), 13 mL
- Lidocaine 1%, 13 mL

Oxygenated whole blood is then added at a four-part crystalloid to one-part whole blood ratio, typically using the Heart-lung machine's circuit as it is delivered to the patient.

==== Mannitol ====
The purpose of the mannitol component is twofold: first, to scavenge oxygen free radicals and thus prevent myocardial injury during cardioplegic arrest and during subsequent reperfusion, and secondly, to reduce the myocardial edema implicated in post-ischemic myocardial impairment.

==== Magnesium Sulfate ====
The myocardial contraction-relaxation cycle, similar to other muscle, is closely reliant upon the intracellular calcium concentration. Magnesium is a calcium channel blocker, so its use in hypothermic cardioplegia improves ventricular recovery when coupled with a low calcium level.

==== Sodium Bicarbonate ====
Red blood cells contain a high concentration of an enzyme called Carbonic anhydrase, which facilitates the scavenging of excess hydrogen ions by combining them with bicarbonate to generate carbon dioxide and water. The sodium bicarbonate component of cardioplegia, in addition to its role in this reaction, as a buffering solution to assist in maintaining intracellular pH.

==== Potassium Chloride ====
A high concentration of potassium, known as hyperkalemia, is the most common arresting method for cardiac surgery. The potassium chloride component of cardioplegia provides a depolarized arrest.

==== Lidocaine ====
Lidocaine in cardioplegia serves as a sodium channel blocker and antiarrhythmic, which helps to prevent the accumulation of both sodium and calcium (through exchange mechanisms) inside the cell.

==== Patient Blood Additive ====
Del Nido cardioplegia is delivered with 20% by volume of fully oxygenated patient blood, supporting transient aerobic metabolism and providing buffering for anaerobic glycolysis, as well as improving coronary perfusion during cardioplegia delivery.
