= Basic Research in Cardiology =

- Discipline: Biology, Health Sciences
- Language: multiple languages

Publication details
- History: 1973-present
- Publisher: Springer Berlin Heidelberg (Germany)
- Impact factor: 17.165 (2020)

Standard abbreviations
- ISO 4: Basic Res. Cardiol.

Indexing
- ISSN: 0300-8428

Links
- Journal homepage

Basic Research in Cardiology is a peer-reviewed scientific journal that was established in 1973 by Springer Berlin Heidelberg.

== Abstracting and indexing ==
Basic Research in Cardiology is abstracted and indexed the following bibliographic databases:

- Science Citation Index Expanded
- Scopus
- BIOSIS
- EMBASE
- MEDLINE

According to the Journal Citation Reports, the journal has a 2020 impact factor of 17.165.
