= Posterior interventricular sulcus =

Groove separating the heart's ventricles

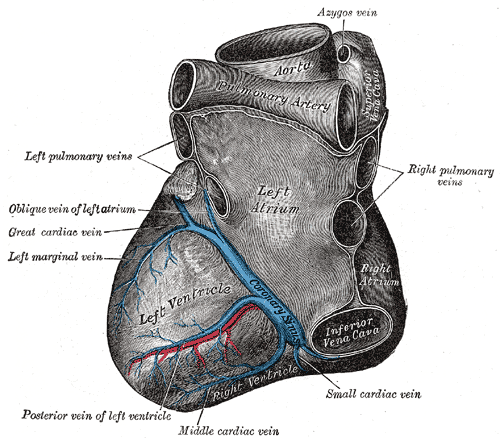
- Base and diaphragmatic surface of heart. (Posterior interventricular sulcus visible at lower left, where the middle cardiac vein is labeled.)

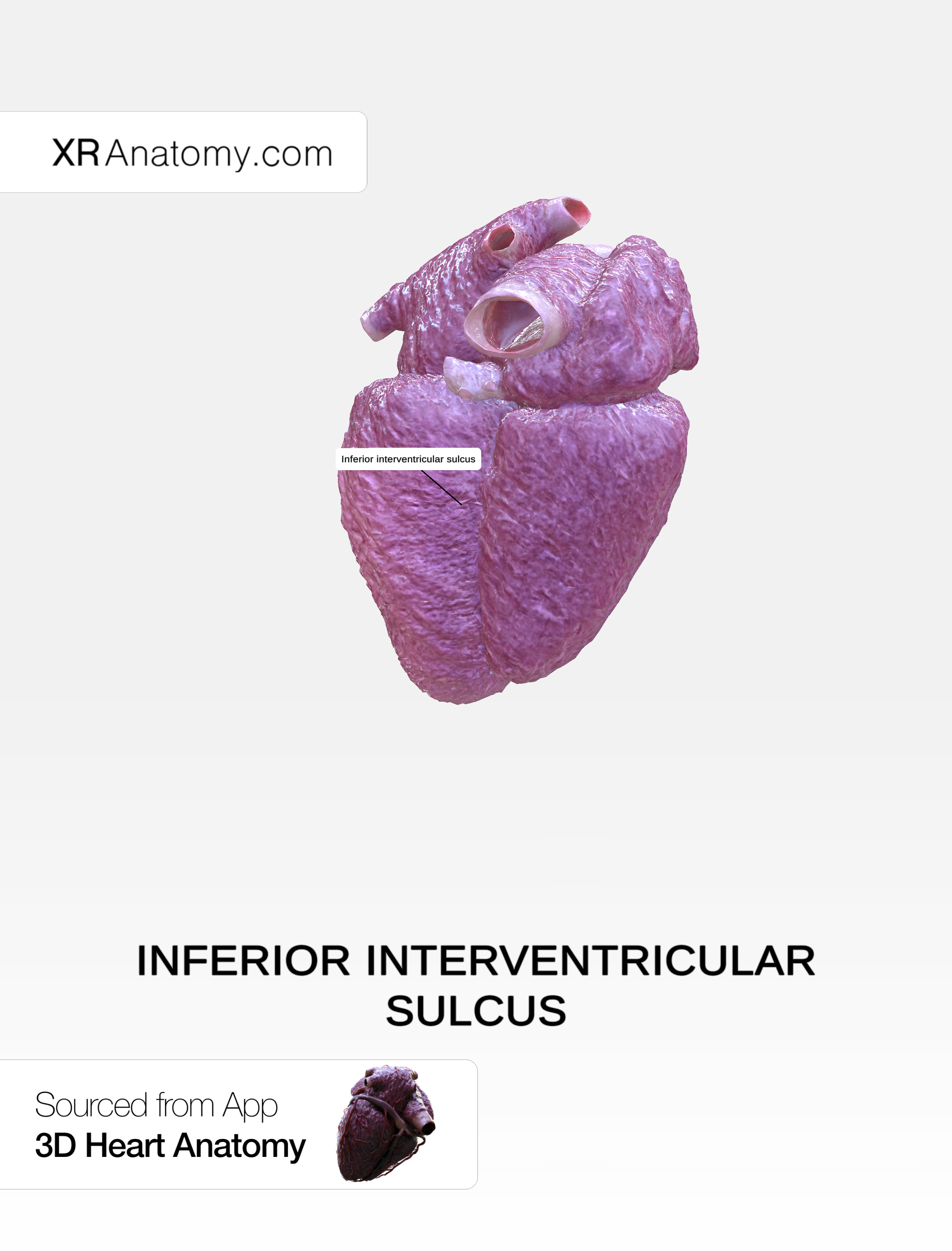

Details

Identifiers
- Latin: sulcus interventricularis posterior
- TA98: A12.1.00.010
- TA2: 3944
- FMA: 7178

The posterior interventricular sulcus or posterior longitudinal sulcus is one of the two grooves separating the ventricles of the heart (the other being the anterior interventricular sulcus). They can be known as subsinosal interventricular groove or paraconal interventricular groove respectively. It is located on the diaphragmatic surface of the heart near the right margin. It extends between the coronary sulcus and the (notch of) apex of the heart. It contains the posterior interventricular artery and middle cardiac vein.
