= Anterior interventricular sulcus =

Groove separating the heart's ventricles

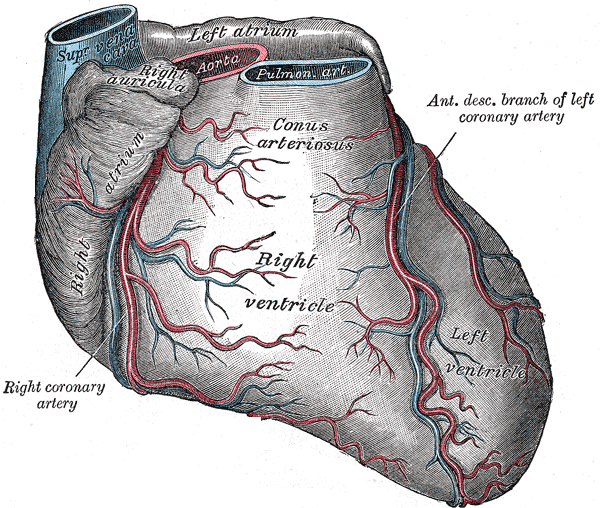
- Sternocostal surface of heart (sulcus visible at bottom right, but not labeled)

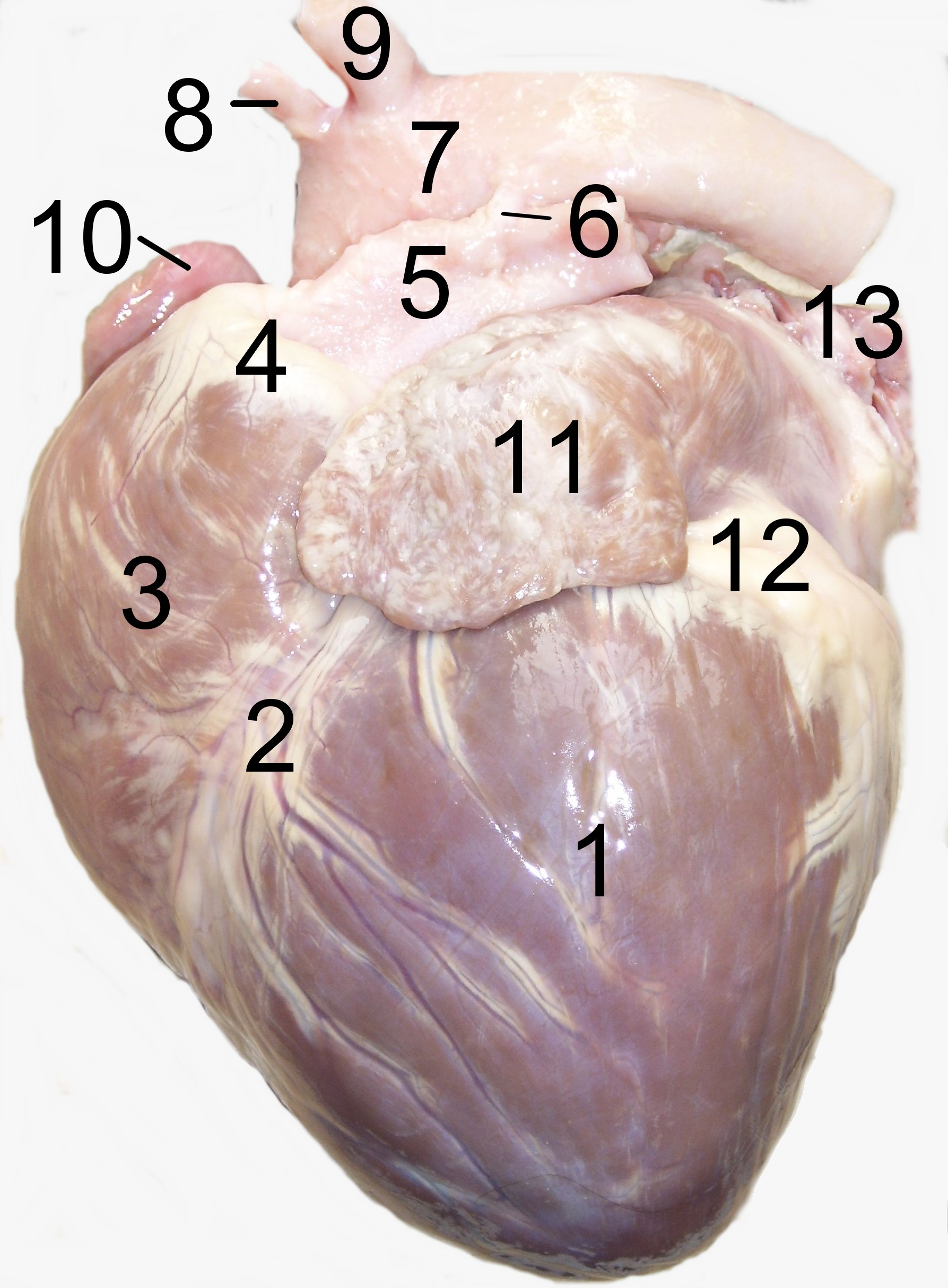
- Heart of a dog.: 1. left ventricle 2. anterior interventricular sulcus 3. right ventricle 4. conus arteriosus 5. pulmonary artery 6. Ligamentum arteriosum 7. aortic arch 8. brachiocephalic artery 9. left subclavian artery 10. right auricle 11. left auricle 12. fat 13. pulmonary vein

Details

Identifiers
- Latin: sulcus interventricularis anterior
- TA98: A12.1.00.009
- TA2: 3943
- FMA: 7177

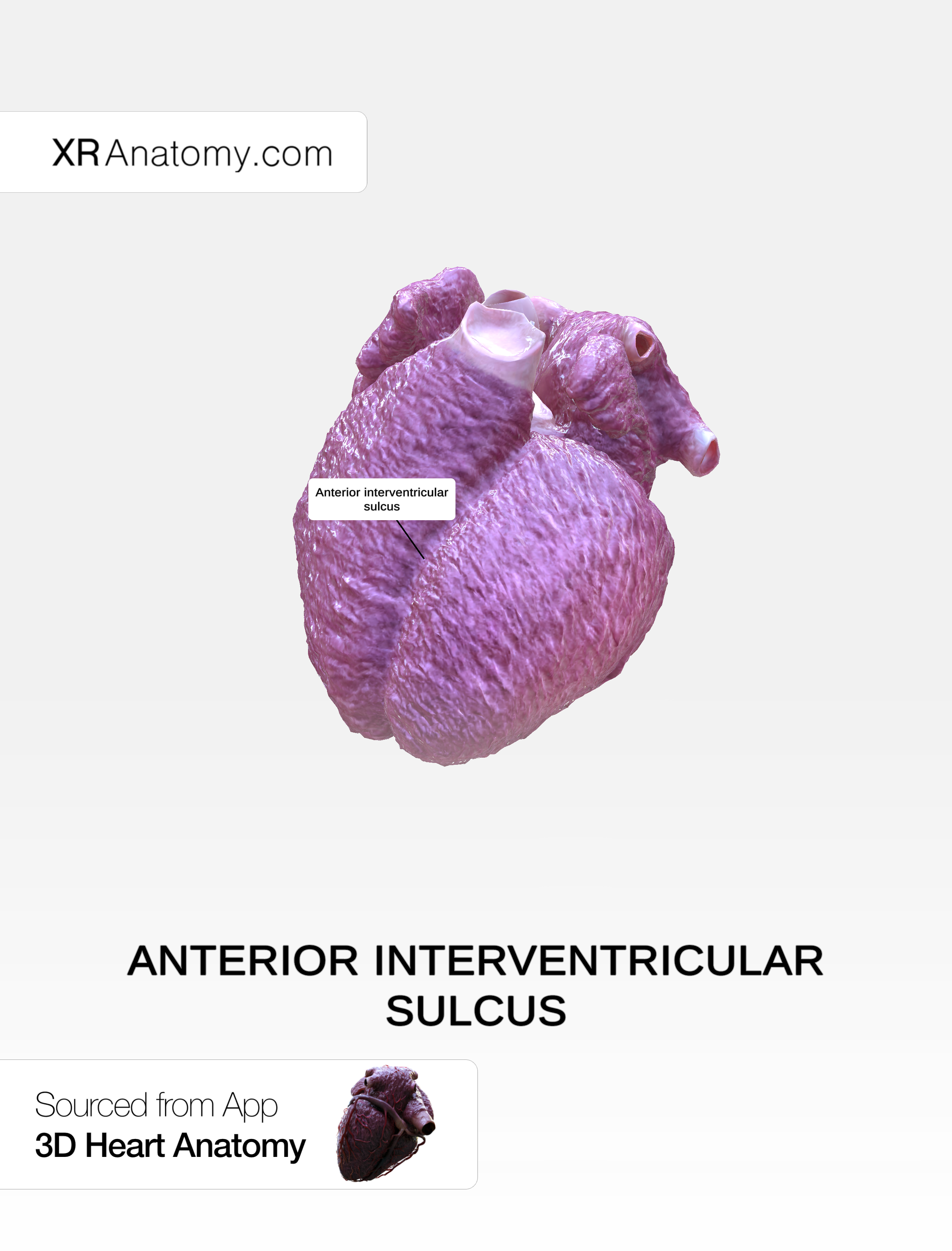

The anterior interventricular sulcus (or anterior longitudinal sulcus) is one of two grooves separating the ventricles of the heart (the other being the posterior interventricular sulcus). They can also be known as paraconal interventricular groove or subsinosal interventricular groove respectively. It is situated on the sternocostal surface of the heart, close to the left margin of the heart. It extends between the coronary sulcus, and the apex of the heart; upon reaching the diaphragmatic surface of the heart, it ends at the notch of cardiac apex. It contains the anterior interventricular branch of the left coronary artery, and great cardiac vein.
