= Constantine Mavroudis =

- Born: July 19, 1946 (age 80); Thasos, Greece
- Education: Rutgers University; University of Virginia School of Medicine
- Occupation: Surgeon
- Known for: Pediatric and congenital heart surgery

Constantine Mavroudis (born July 19, 1946) is an American pediatric and congenital heart surgeon, academic, and author. He is professor emeritus of surgery at the Johns Hopkins University School of Medicine. His clinical and research work has focused on congenital heart defects, pediatric cardiac surgery, arrhythmia surgery, and heart transplantation. He has edited surgical textbooks, including Pediatric Cardiac Surgery, and has published scientific articles, book chapters, a memoir, and other works of fiction and short stories.

== Early life and education ==
Mavroudis was born on the Greek island of Thasos and immigrated to the United States with his family in 1947. He grew up in Jersey City, New Jersey, where his parents operated a luncheonette and ice cream parlor. His early interests included science, literature, music, and philosophy. He attended Dickinson High School and participated in varsity fencing, later receiving a fencing scholarship to Rutgers University–New Brunswick. At Rutgers College, Mavroudis studied biological sciences and graduated in 1968. He captained the Rutgers fencing team and was a member of the American team that participated in the Martini & Rossi World Invitational Fencing Tournament at the New York Athletic Club in New York City in 1968.

He received his medical degree from the University of Virginia School of Medicine in 1973. He then completed general surgery residency training at the University of California, San Francisco (UCSF), from 1973 to 1979, including a research fellowship in 1976–1977, followed by cardiothoracic surgery training from 1979 to 1981.

== Medical career ==
Mavroudis began his academic surgical career at the University of Louisville School of Medicine in 1981. He became chief of pediatric cardiac surgery and subsequently a professor of surgery. During this period, he participated in the development of surgical treatment for children with complex congenital heart conditions. In June 1986, Mavroudis performed a heart transplant on a 23-day-old infant at Kosair Children's Hospital in Louisville, Kentucky. The procedure was part of the early development of neonatal heart transplantation in the United States and took place when treatment options for infants with hypoplastic left heart syndrome were limited.

In 1989, Mavroudis joined Northwestern University Feinberg School of Medicine and Children's Memorial Hospital in Chicago. He served as director of the Division of Pediatric Cardiac Surgery and surgeon-in-chief of the hospital. He held the A. C. Buehler Professorship of Surgery before becoming the Willis J. Potts Professor of Surgery in 2002.

From 2008 to 2011, Mavroudis chaired the Department of Pediatric and Congenital Heart Surgery at the Cleveland Clinic. He also held a joint appointment in the institution's Department of Bioethics. His work combined surgical practice with consideration of ethical questions arising in the treatment of children with serious congenital heart disease.

From 2012 to 2019, he directed congenital heart surgery at AdventHealth for Children in Orlando, Florida, while serving as a professor of surgery at the Johns Hopkins University School of Medicine. In 2020, Johns Hopkins named him professor emeritus of surgery. He subsequently served as chief of pediatric cardiothoracic surgery at Peyton Manning Children's Hospital in Indianapolis, Indiana, until retiring from clinical surgery in 2024.

Mavroudis was president of the Congenital Heart Surgeons' Society from 2004 to 2006, and President of the Southern Thoracic Surgical Association in 2002. He was inducted into the Rutgers Hall of Distinguished Alumni in 2025.

== Research and scholarly works ==
Mavroudis has contributed to more than 575 peer-reviewed journal articles and book chapters on congenital heart surgery, pediatric cardiology, and cardiothoracic surgical techniques. His research has focused on congenital heart defects, the surgical repair of complex cardiac abnormalities, pediatric arrhythmias, coronary artery surgery in children, and outcomes in congenital heart surgery. His publications have addressed surgical techniques, clinical outcomes, and the evaluation of care for patients with congenital heart disease, including research involving the Society of Thoracic Surgeons' national congenital heart surgery database.

Mavroudis has also published on medical ethics in pediatric cardiology and cardiac surgery, as well as the history and development of professional organizations in congenital heart surgery. In 2023, he co-authored publications examining the history of the Congenital Heart Surgeons' Society and the contributions of its presidents. His research has appeared in journals including The Annals of Thoracic Surgery, The Journal of Thoracic and Cardiovascular Surgery, and Cardiology in the Young.

Mavroudis has edited and contributed to several surgical reference books, including Pediatric Cardiac Surgery, which reached its fifth edition, Atlas of Pediatric Heart Surgery, Atlas of Adult Congenital Heart Surgery, Bioethical Controversies in Pediatric Cardiology and Pediatric Cardiac Surgery, and Management of Perioperative Complications of Pediatric and Congenital Cardiac Surgery. These works cover surgical procedures, clinical decision-making, perioperative complications, and ethical issues in the treatment of congenital heart disease.

His editorial appointments have included deputy editor for congenital heart surgery at The Annals of Thoracic Surgery, associate editor of Cardiology in the Young, and consulting editor for the World Journal for Pediatric and Congenital Heart Surgery.

Alongside his medical publications, Mavroudis has written memoir and fiction. His memoir, Finding the Way: A Memoir, was published by Dorrance Publishing in 2024.In 2026, he published his debut novel, The Surgeon’s Odyssey: War, Loss, and Redemption, with MindStir Media. A sequel, Life in the Balance: The Argyros Protocol, is scheduled for publication at the end of 2026.

== Personal life ==
Mavroudis has been married to Martha Smith, originally from Louisville, Kentucky, for 44 years. She is a figurative painter working in a 21st-century surrealist style and is also a gourmet chef. They have two children, Paula and Constantine.

Mavroudis has participated in endurance sports, including marathon running and triathlons. According to the Rutgers University Foundation, he completed 11 marathons, 100 Olympic-distance triathlons, and 15 Ironman-distance events. His interests have also included literature, classical music, philosophy, and fencing.

== Awards and recognition ==
In 2025, Mavroudis was inducted into the Rutgers University Hall of Distinguished Alumni in recognition of his career in pediatric cardiac surgery.

== Selected publications and books ==
- MD, Constantine Mavroudis (2026-10-06). The Surgeon's Odyssey. MindStir Media. ISBN 979-8-950391-74-3.
- Mavroudis, Constantine; Backer, Carl L., eds. (2023-02-03). Pediatric Cardiac Surgery (5th ed.). Wiley. doi:10.1002/9781119282327. ISBN 978-1-119-28231-0.
- Mavroudis, Constantine; Backer, Carl Lewis, eds. (2015). Atlas of Pediatric Cardiac Surgery. London: Springer London. doi:10.1007/978-1-4471-5319-1. ISBN 978-1-4471-5318-4.
- Mavroudis, Constantine; Dearani, Joseph A., eds. (2020). Atlas of Adult Congenital Heart Surgery. Cham, Switzerland: Springer. ISBN 978-3-030-14165-3.
- Mavroudis, Constantine (2020). Bioethical Controversies in Pediatric Cardiology and Cardiac Surgery. J. Thomas Cook, Constantine D. Mavroudis. Cham: Springer International Publishing AG. ISBN 978-3-030-35660-6.
- Mavroudis, Constantine; Williams, William G. (September 2023). "The Early History of the Congenital Heart Surgeons' Society". World Journal for Pediatric and Congenital Heart Surgery. 14 (5): 546–551. doi:10.1177/21501351231178729. ISSN 2150-1351. PMID 37737594.
- Mavroudis, Constantine; Backer, Carl L.; Brown, John W.; Williams, William G. (2023). "The Congenital Heart Surgeons' Society Presidents and Their Contributions". World Journal for Pediatric and Congenital Heart Surgery. 14 (5): 559–571. doi:10.1177/21501351231181331. ISSN 2150-1351. PMID 37737595.
- Mavroudis, Constantine (17 January 2024). Finding the Way. Dorrance Publishing. ISBN 9798893411331.
