= Coronary ischemia =

- Other names: myocardial ischemia, cardiac ischemia
- Coronary arteries of the human heart
- Specialty: Cardiology

Coronary ischemia, myocardial ischemia, or cardiac ischemia, is a medical term for abnormally reduced blood flow in the coronary circulation through the coronary arteries. Coronary ischemia is linked to heart disease, and heart attacks. Coronary arteries deliver oxygen-rich blood to the heart muscle. Reduced blood flow to the heart associated with coronary ischemia can result in inadequate oxygen supply to the heart muscle. When oxygen supply to the heart is unable to keep up with oxygen demand from the muscle, the result is the characteristic symptoms of coronary ischemia, the most common of which is chest pain. Chest pain due to coronary ischemia commonly radiates to the arm or neck. Certain individuals such as women, diabetics, and the elderly may present with more varied symptoms. If blood flow through the coronary arteries is stopped completely, cardiac muscle cells may die, known as a myocardial infarction, or heart attack.

Coronary artery disease (CAD) is the most common cause of coronary ischemia. Coronary ischemia and coronary artery disease are contributors to the development of heart failure over time. Diagnosis of coronary ischemia is achieved by an attaining a medical history and physical examination in addition to other tests such as electrocardiography (ECG), stress testing, and coronary angiography. Treatment is aimed toward preventing future adverse events and relieving symptoms. Beneficial lifestyle modifications include smoking cessation, a heart healthy diet, and regular exercise. Medications such as nitrates and beta-blockers may be useful for reducing the symptoms of coronary ischemia, with beta-blockers also improving long term outcomes in most studies. In refractory cases, invasive procedures such as percutaneous coronary intervention (PCI) or coronary artery bypass graft (CABG) may be performed to relieve coronary ischemia.

Recently, evidence has been found that ischemia can also occur without coronary obstruction (a conditional known as INOCA - ischemia with no obstructed arteries). Other studies have found that long COVID or post acute COVID syndrome can also be associated with myocardial ischemia. Treatment for both conditions is similar to treatment for ischemia caused by CAD.

== INOCA ==
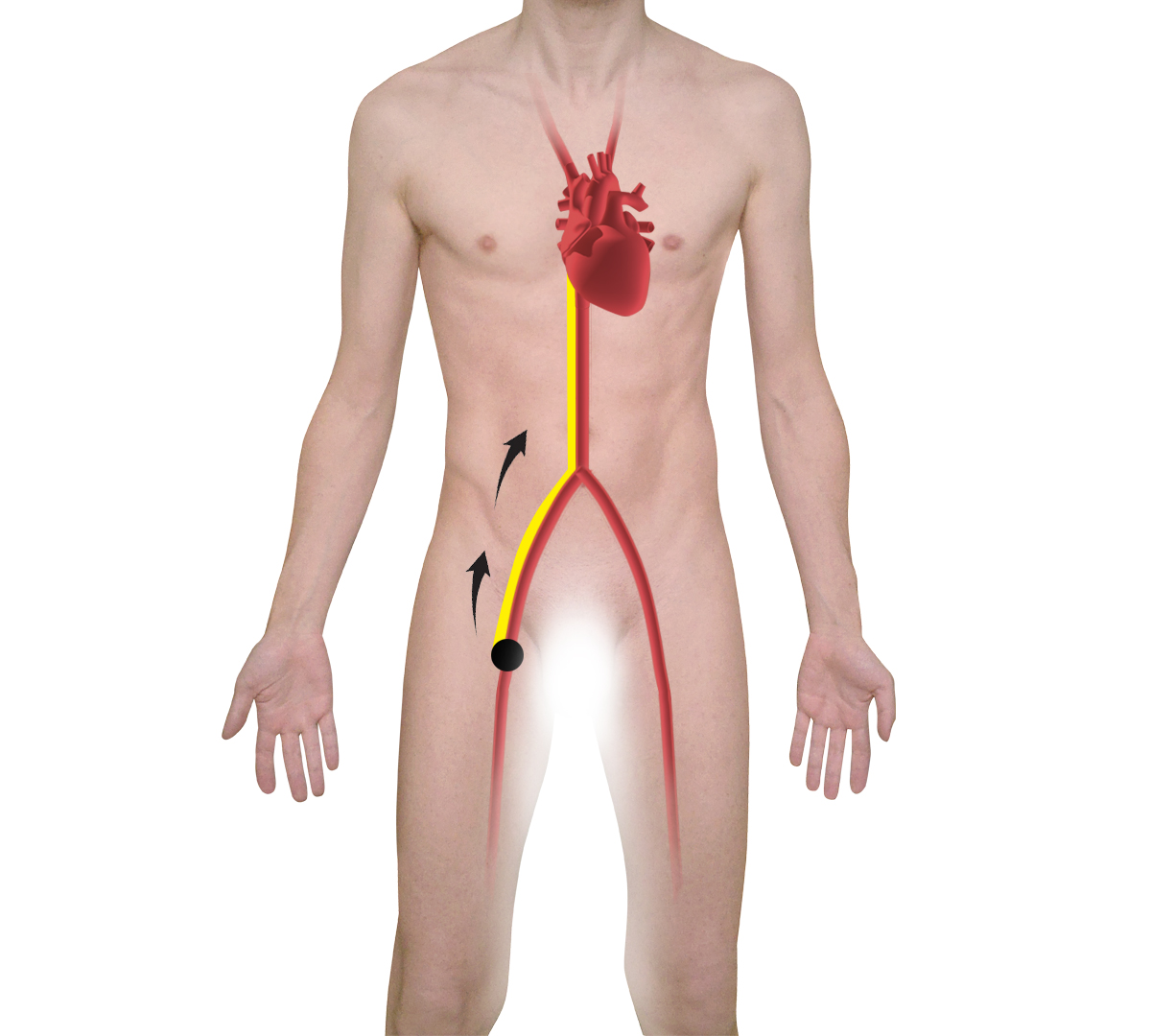

INOCA is cardiac ischemia with no coronary artery obstruction. Approximately 3-4 million people have been diagnosed with this condition; with female diagnosis prevalent. Other risk factors include advanced age, smoking, hyperlipidemia, inflammatory disease, diabetes and glucose intolerance. Diagnosis of INOCA can begin with non-invasive testing including PET with myocardial perfusion imaging (MPI) or stress cardiovascular magnetic resonance (CMR) imaging. However, final diagnosis must be made with cardiac angiography to confirm the absence of occlusion.

== Ischemia Involving SARS-CoV-2 ==
Data involving cardiac ischemia resulting from post acute COVID syndrome (or Long COVID) is evolving. Various studies have been combined to show a significant percentage of patients presenting with myocardial ischemia post COVID infection (infection requiring hospitalization) with no documented prior history of coronary disease. Vaccination (with 2 doses) has been shown to decrease the risk of Long COVID in recent studies.

== Signs and symptoms ==
A key symptom of coronary ischemia is chest pain or pressure, known as angina pectoris. Angina may present typically with classic symptoms or atypically with symptoms less often associated with heart disease. Atypical presentations are more common in women, diabetics, and elderly individuals. Angina may be stable or unstable. Unstable angina is most often associated with emergent, acute coronary syndromes.

Angina is typically located below the sternum. Individuals experiencing angina characterize the pain in different ways, but the pain is usually described as crushing, squeezing, or burning. Symptoms may worsen over the course of several minutes. Typical angina is aggravated by physical activity or emotional stress and is relieved by rest or nitroglycerin. The pain may radiate to other parts of the body, most commonly the left arm or neck. In some individuals, the pain may be less severe and present as pressure or numbness. Less commonly, the pain may radiate to both arms, the jaw, or to the back.

=== Atypical ===
Women, diabetic individuals, and elderly individuals are more likely to present with atypical symptoms other than chest pain. Women may present with back pain, shortness of breath, heartburn, nausea, and vomiting. Heart disease in women goes undetected prior to a major cardiac event in up to 60% of cases. Among women who experience a heart attack, many do not have any prior chest pain. Due to alterations in sensory pathways, diabetic and elderly individuals also may present without any chest pain and may have atypical symptoms similar to those seen in women. This type of ischemia is also known as silent ischemia.

== Causes ==
Coronary artery disease (CAD) occurs when fatty substances, known as plaques, adhere to the walls of coronary arteries supplying the heart, narrowing them and constricting blood flow, a process known as atherosclerosis, the most common cause of coronary ischemia. Angina may start to occur when the vessel is 70% occluded. Lack of oxygen may also result in a myocardial infarction (heart attack). Two general mechanisms are thought to precipitate atherosclerotic cardiac ischemia: endothelial erosion and cap rupture. In the former case, the thrombogenic fibrillar collagens that make up the fibrous cap of plaques are exposed to the arterial lumen following erosion of the overlying endothelium, thus promoting the formation of a thrombus and causing up to one third of acute coronary syndromes. In the latter case, rupture of most commonly a thin fibrous cap, which typically separates the highly thrombogenic, fatty necrotic core of the plaque from the arterial lumen, results in a discontinuity through which the necrotic material in the core can leak out of into the arterial lumen. This may lead to the formation of a potentially ischemic thrombus.

CAD can be contracted over time. Risk factors include a family history of CAD, smoking, high blood pressure, diabetes, obesity, inactive lifestyle, mental stress and high cholesterol. Angina can also occur due to spasm of the coronary arteries, even in individuals without atherosclerosis. In coronary artery spasm, the vessel constricts to limit blood flow through the artery, causing a decrease in oxygen supply to the heart, although the mechanisms for this phenomenon are not fully understood.

== Natural course ==
Coronary ischemia can have serious consequences if it is not treated. Plaques in the walls of the coronary arteries can rupture, resulting in occlusion of the artery and deprivation of blood flow and oxygen to the heart muscle, resulting in cardiac cell death. This is known as myocardial infarction. A heart attack can cause arrhythmias, as well as permanent damage to the heart muscle. Coronary ischemia resulting from coronary artery disease also increases the risk of developing heart failure. Most cases of heart failure result from underlying coronary artery disease. A myocardial infarction carries a greater than five-fold increase in relative risk for developing heart failure.

== Diagnosis ==
If coronary ischemia is suspected, a series of tests will be undertaken for confirmation. The most common tests used are an electrocardiogram, an exercise stress test, and a coronary angiography. A variety of laboratory tests may be ordered. An important laboratory test to determine if myocardial damage has occurred is a cardiac troponin value. A medical history will be taken, including queries about past incidence of chest pain or shortness of breath. The duration and frequency of symptoms will be noted as will any measures taken to relieve the symptoms.

=== Electrocardiogram ===
A resting electrocardiogram (EKG) is an early step in the diagnostic process. An electrocardiogram (EKG) involves the use of electrodes that are placed on the arms, chest, and legs. These sensors detect any abnormal rhythms that the heart may be producing. This test is painless and it helps detect insufficient blood flow to the heart. An EKG can also detect damage that has been done in the past to the heart. This test can also detect any thickening in the walls of the left ventricles as well as any defects in the electrical impulses of the heart. It is quick and provides the Physician with the P/PR, Heart Rate, QRS, QT/QTcF, P/QRS/T, and axis results.

=== Exercise stress electrocardiogram ===
A cardiac stress test puts stress on the heart through exercise. A series of exercises to measure the tolerance for stress on the heart will be carried out. This test uses an EKG to detect the electrical impulses of the heart during physical exertion.

A treadmill or exercise bike will be used. The incline or resistance of the bike are steadily increased until the target heart rate for the person's age and weight is reached. However, an exercise stress test is not always accurate in determining the presence of a blockage in the arteries. Women and those who are young may show abnormalities on their test even though no signs of coronary ischemia or CAD are present. Harmless arrhythmias present at baseline may distort the results. Diagnosis of coronary artery disease is missed in 37% of men and 18% of women with a negative test. However, those patients who are able to complete the test are at lower risk of future cardiac events.

=== Stress echocardiography ===
Stress echocardiography is very commonly used in assessing for ischemia resulting from coronary artery disease. It can be performed exercising, preferably with a bicycle that allows the patient to exercise while lying flat, which allows for imaging throughout the entire testing period. While the patient is exercising, images of the heart in motion are generated. Ischemia can be detected by visualizing abnormalities in the movement of the heart and the thickness of the heart wall during exercise.

Some people may be unable to exercise in order to achieve a sufficient heart rate for a useful test. In these cases, high-dose dobutamine may be used to chemically increase heart rate. If dobutamine is insufficient for this purpose, atropine be added to reach goal heart rate. Dipyridamole is an alternative to dobutamine but it is less effective in detecting abnormalities. While exercise echocardiograms are more effective in detecting coronary artery disease, all forms of stress echocardiograms are more effective than exercise EKG in detecting coronary ischemia secondary to coronary artery disease. If stress echocardiography is normal, risk of future adverse cardiac events is low enough that invasive coronary angiography is not needed.

=== Coronary angiography ===
A coronary angiography is performed after a stress test or EKG shows abnormal results. This test is very important in finding where the blockages are in the arteries. This test helps determine if an angioplasty or bypass surgery is needed. Coronary angiography should only be performed if a patient is willing to undergo a coronary revascularization procedure.

During this test the doctor makes a small incision in the patient's groin or arm and inserts a catheter. The catheter has a very small video camera on the end of it so that the doctor can find the arteries. Once they have found the arteries, they inject a dye in them so that they can detect any blockages in the arteries. The dye is able to be seen on a special x-ray machine.

== Treatment ==
Coronary ischemia can be treated but not cured. By changing lifestyle, further blockages can be prevented. A change in lifestyle, mixed with prescribed medication, can improve health. In some cases, coronary revascularization procedures may be used.

=== Smoking cessation ===
Tobacco smoking is a clear risk factor for development of coronary artery disease. Exposure to second hand smoke also has clear cardiovascular risks. Tobacco smokers have higher levels of cholesterol and triglycerides which are risk factors for development of coronary artery disease. Smoking has been shown in numerous studies to accelerate atherosclerosis by several years. A study showed that those who quit smoking reduced their risk of being hospitalized over the next two years. The benefits of smoking cessation are greater the longer an individual has been abstinent from tobacco. After two years of smoking cessation, risk of heart attack can be cut in half. Smoking cessation has a significant mortality benefit regardless of age. Nicotine replacement therapy, bupropion, and varenicline are safe therapies that improve the likelihood of smoking cessation.

=== Healthy diet ===
A healthy diet is a very important factor in preventing coronary ischemia or coronary artery disease. A heart-healthy diet is low in saturated fat and cholesterol and high in fruits, vegetables, and whole grains. Recent studies have shown that there is an inverse correlation between increased fruit and vegetable intake and the risk of CAD. A mortality benefit has been seen in individuals with higher intake of whole grains. These food choices can reduce the risk of a heart attack or any other congestive heart failure event. These foods may also slow further growth of plaques in the coronary arteries and reduce further ischemia.

=== Physical activity ===
By increasing physical activity, it is possible to manage body weight, reduce blood pressure, and relieve stress. Moderate intensity exercise of 30–60 minutes per day for 5–7 days per week is recommended. Moderate intensity exercise is defined as exercise that increases heart rate to 55-74% of maximum heart rate. High intensity exercise increasing the heart rate to 70-100% of maximum heart rate for shorter intervals is at least as effective, and this type of exercise may increase oxygen uptake by the heart compared to moderate intensity exercise. Per the Centers for Disease Control, an estimate of maximum heart rate for an individual can be calculated by subtracting age from 220. Exercising this way can reduce the risk of getting heart disease or coronary ischemia.

=== Medication-based therapy ===
Medication-based therapy for coronary ischemia should be focused on reducing the likelihood of future adverse cardiac events and treating symptoms of coronary ischemia such as angina. Key medications with strong evidence of benefit include aspirin, or alternatively clopidogrel. These medications help to prevent clots in the coronary artery and the occlusion which can lead to a heart attack. Angiotensin-converting enzyme inhibitors are indicated in individuals with diabetes, kidney disease, and hypertension. Statin medications help to reduce cholesterol and plaque formation and may even contribute to plaque regression.

Other medications may be used to reduce the symptoms of coronary ischemia, particularly angina. Long and short acting nitrates are one option for reducing anginal pain. Nitrates reduce the symptoms of angina by dilating blood vessels around the heart, which increases oxygen-rich blood supply to the muscle cells of the heart. Veins are also dilated, which reduces return of blood to the heart, easing strain on the heart muscle. Short-acting nitrates can be taken upon the onset of symptoms and should provide relief within minutes. Nitroglycerin is the most common short-acting nitrate and it is applied under the tongue. Long acting nitrates are taken 2-3 times per day and can be used to prevent angina. Beta-blockers may also be used to reduce the incidence of chronic angina. Beta-blockers prevent episodes of angina by reducing heart rate and reducing the strength of contraction of the heart, which lowers oxygen demand in the heart.

=== Coronary revascularization ===
In individuals with symptoms that are not well controlled with medical and lifestyle therapy there are invasive options available including percutaneous coronary intervention (PCI) and coronary artery bypass graft (CABG). PCI involves placing a stent to relieve coronary artery blockages. CABG involves grafting new blood vessels to provide a new route for blood flow around the blocked vessel. Choice of treatment is based on the number of coronary vessels with blockages, which vessels are effected, and the medical history of the patient. There is not sufficient evidence to suggest that PCI or CABG provides a mortality benefit in individuals with stable coronary ischemia. More recently, research has been investigating the short- and long-term efficacy of Hybrid Coronary Revascularization (HCR), a combination of both PCI and CABG. Some research supports that HCR is a stronger option compared to PCI or CABG alone for multivessel coronary artery disease because HCR is better at lowering the risk of short-term adverse cardiac/vascular events.
