= Coronary occlusion =

Obstruction of the coronary artery

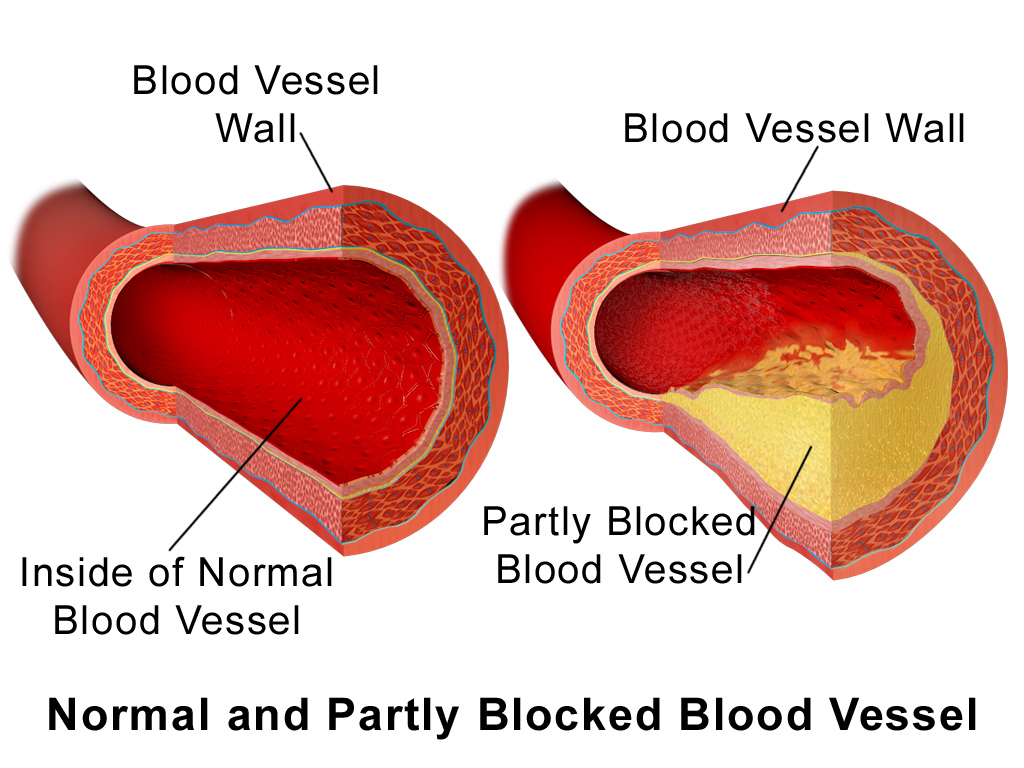
- Normal and partially blocked/occluded blood vessel
- Specialty: Cardiology
- Symptoms: Chest pain, shortness of breath, irregular heartbeat, nausea, and drowsiness
- Treatment: Medication, percutaneous coronary intervention, or coronary artery bypass surgery

A coronary occlusion, or coronary artery disease, is the partial or complete obstruction of blood flow in a coronary artery. This condition was first discussed in 1910 by Sir William Osler. This condition slows or blocks the supply of oxygen-rich blood to the heart. This condition can lead to myocardial ischemia and if untreated, may cause a heart attack and heart failure. It is the most common form of cardiovascular disease, and is the leading cause of death in the United States, affecting 18 million adults or about 5% of the population.

== Signs and symptoms ==
Symptoms include chest pain or angina, shortness of breath, and fatigue.

A completely blocked coronary artery will cause a heart attack. Common heart attack symptoms include chest pain or angina, pain or discomfort that spreads to the shoulder, arm, back, neck jaw, teeth or the upper belly, cold sweats, fatigue, heartburn, nausea, shortness of breath, or lightheadedness.

== Causes ==
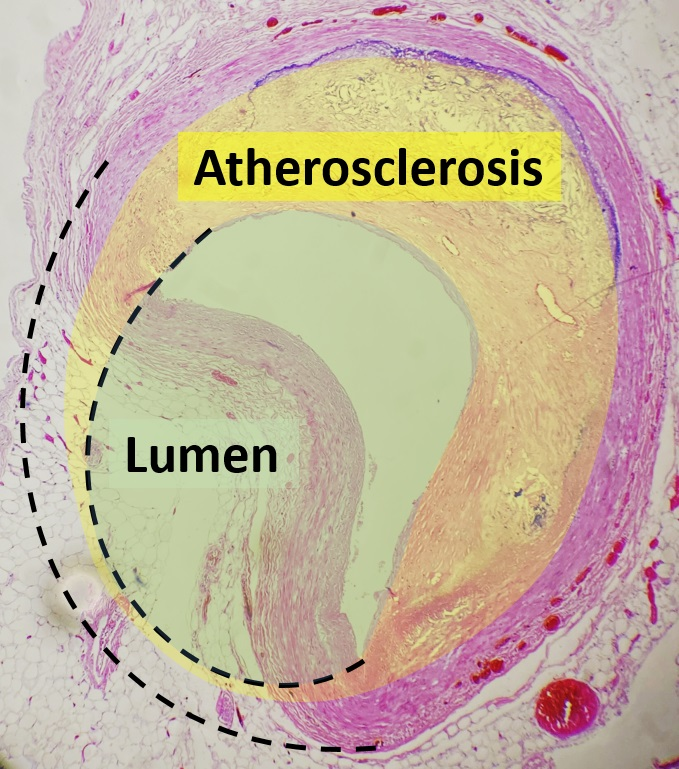
Image depicting atherosclerosis.

Coronary occlusion is caused by the buildup of fats, cholesterol and other substances in and on the walls of the hearts arteries. As plaque builds up, the arteries narrow. Plaque often starts building up during childhood and is heavily influenced by genetics, but also lifestyle and high blood cholesterol. This condition is referred to as atherosclerosis. The buildup on the walls of the hearts arteries is referred to as plaque. Plaque causes arteries to narrow and block blood flow.

Conditions that aid in the development of coronary artery disease are diabetes or insulin resistance, high blood pressure, sedentary lifestyle, and smoking or tobacco use.

Risk Factors that are not controllable are age, birth sex, and family history. Getting older increases the risk of damaged and narrowed arteries. Men are at a greater risk of coronary artery disease, with women's risk increasing after menopause.

== Pathophysiology ==
Coronary occlusion is caused by plaque inside of the blood vessels that direct oxygen rich blood to the heart. Plaque is caused by fatty deposits and scar tissue that cling to the walls of coronary arteries. The development of plaque takes years and leads to stenosis of the coronary arteries and progressively reduces blood flow. Due to the slower development of this condition, the body will adapt and create small blood vessels that circumvent the blockage. The small blood vessels form a natural bypass of the blockage, but often do not supply enough blood to meet an increased demand when stressors are applied like exercise.

When a plaque has a greater than 50% diameter stenosis, the reduced blood flow through the coronary artery during exertion may lead to angina. Acute coronary events occur when a thrombus forms due to disruption of a plaque. In acute heart attack, occlusion is greater than in unstable angina, where arterial occlusion is not full blockage. Downstream embolism of thrombus may also produce microinfarcts.

== Diagnosis ==
Heart disease is often undiagnosed until a serious problem occurs, such as heart attack or cardiac arrest. Regular checkups can lead to an early diagnosis and preventative treatment. Screening tests and risk assessments should begin around age 20 if one does not have any risk factors. Screenings should begin in childhood if one has risk factors such as obesity, sedentary lifestyle, or a family history of heart conditions.

Healthcare providers will run blood tests to check for cholesterol, triglycerides, lipoproteins, sugar, or proteins that are a sign of inflammation.

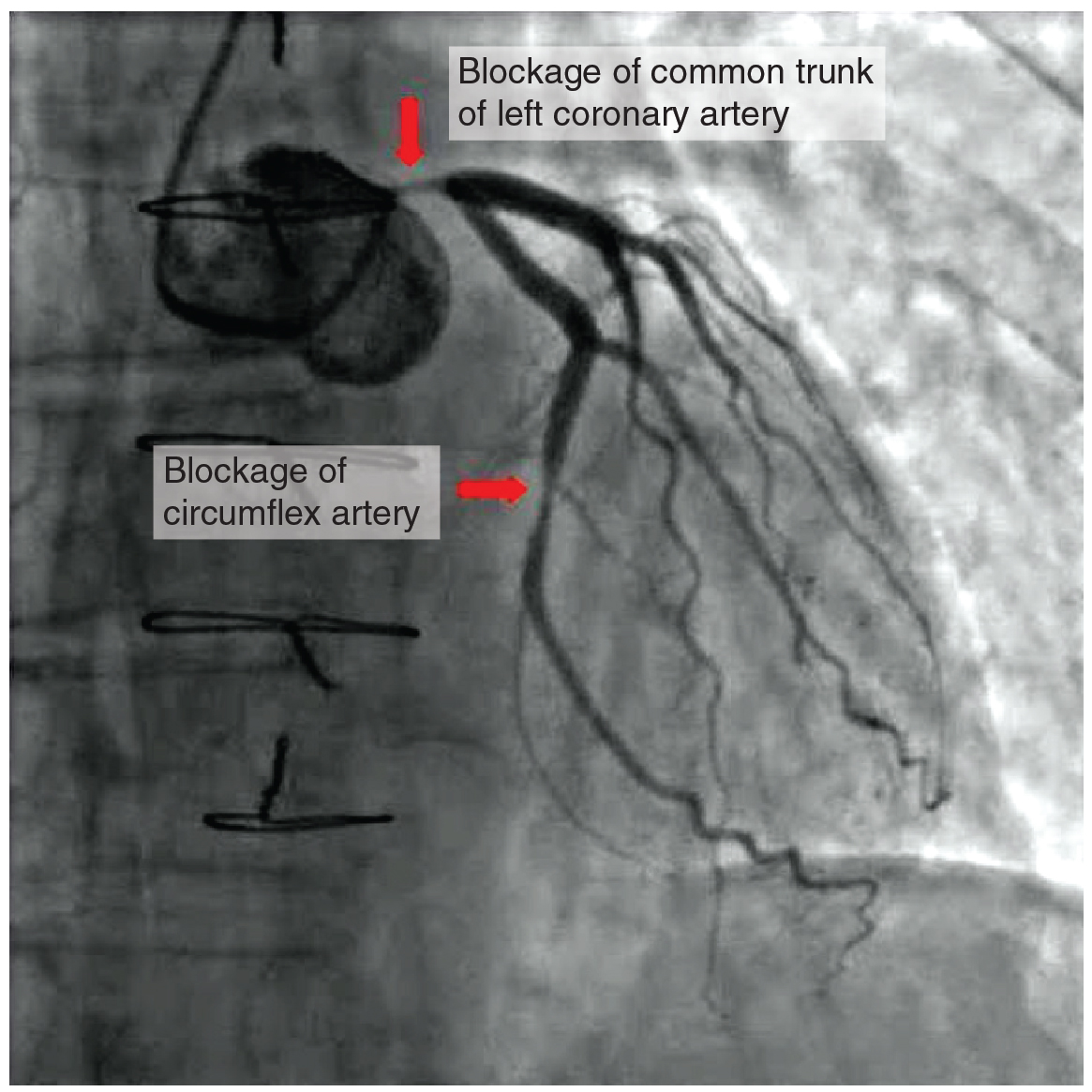
Coronary Angiography showing occluded coronary arteries.

To assist in a diagnosis, healthcare providers may also order a electrocardiogram (ECG or EKG), coronary calcium scan, stress test, cardiac magnetic resonance imaging (MRI), cardiac positron emission tomography (PET), invasive coronary angiography, and/or coronary CT angiography.

== Treatment ==
Healthcare providers may recommend lifelong heart-healthy lifestyle choices. These choices included a heart-healthy eating plan, physical activity, quitting smoking, improved sleep hygiene, weight loss, blood pressure control, cholesterol control, blood pressure control, and stress management.

Some medications may be prescribed to allow the blood vessels to widen and help the heart pump include ACE inhibitors, beta blockers, calcium channel blockers, nitrates, and Ranolazine.

Some medications may be prescribed to manage cholesterol include statins, nonstatins, and fribrates.

Some medications may be prescribed for other risk factors for heart disease like blood sugar and obesity such as empagliflozin, canagliflozin, metformin, liraglutide, orlistat, and semaglutide.

Heart surgery may be needed to treat this condition. Some procedures include percutaneous coronary intervention (PCI), coronary artery bypass grafting (CABG), and transmyocardial laser revascularization (coronary endarterectomy).

Preventative procedures like bariatric surgery can help lower coronary heart disease risk.

== Prognosis ==
Coronary artery disease cannot be reversed. To reduce future problems, a patient may be referred to get exercise-based cardiac rehabilitation.

Patients with coronary artery disease over 15-year period based on expectations in a 1-year follow up saw a mortality rate of those in the highest quartiles of expectations are 28-30 deaths per 100 patients. The lowest quartile of expectations are 50-57 deaths per 100 patients.

Prognosis for heart attacks when people reach emergency care promptly improve dramatically, though many people still die before reaching the hospital. One out of every 10 patients who have a heart attack die within the first three to four months.

== Epidemiology ==
Coronary artery disease is the leading cause of death in men and women. This condition is the cause of one third of all deaths, which is especially worse in areas with lower socioeconomic status. Mortality is nearly five times higher in men than women, but mortality difference narrows with age.

Black women are more likely than white women to have a heart attack. Black adults have a higher mortality rate than white adults from heart attack.

Asian adults have the least incidence of coronary artery disease. Asian Indian men, Filipino men and Filipino women have a higher risk than white people.

Young Hispanic women who have a heart attack have a higher mortality rate than young Hispanic men. They have a higher mortality rate than young Black adults and young white adults.

== Research directions ==
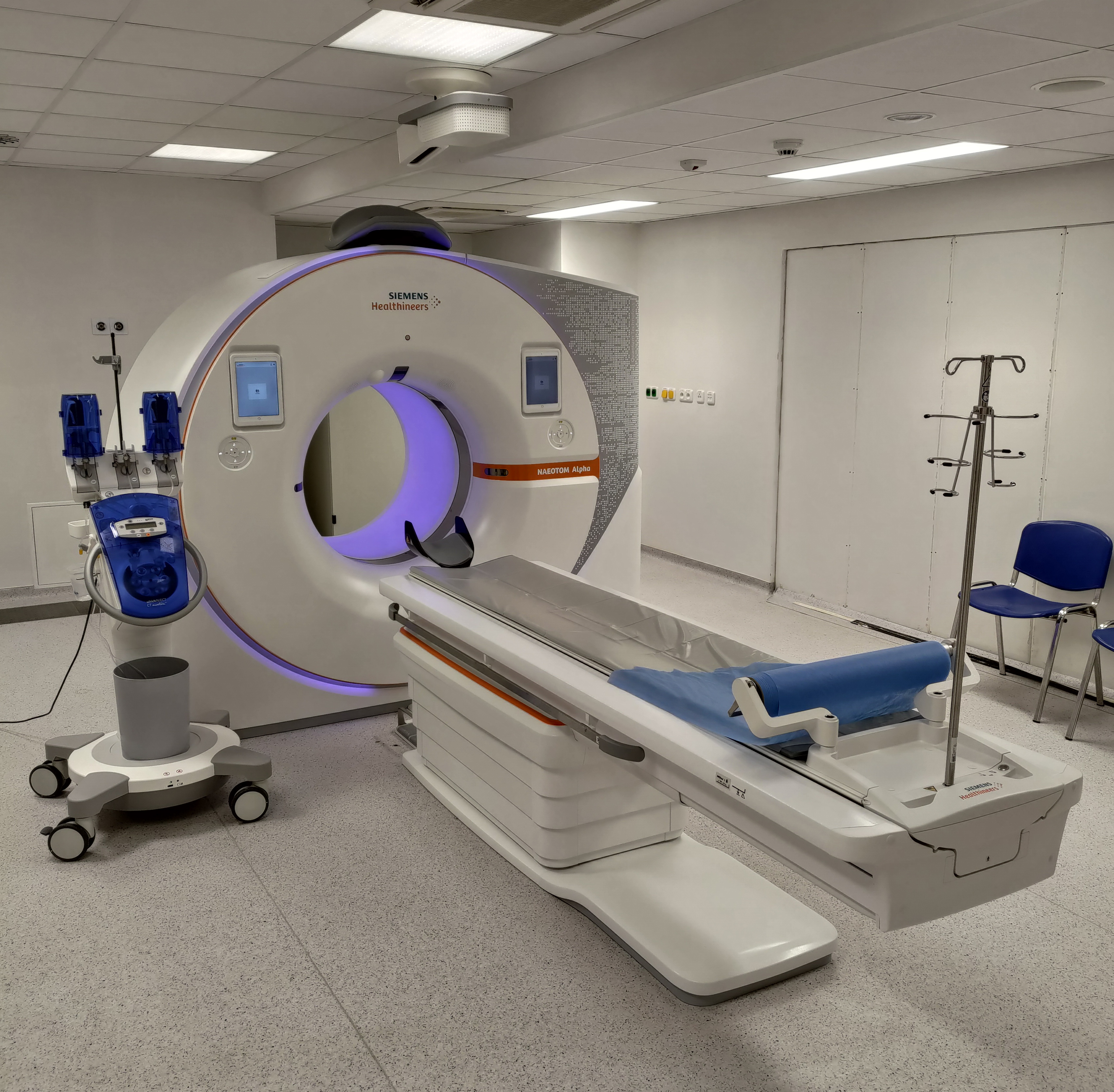
Image of a computed tomography scanner.

Further research directions in preventing and treating coronary artery disease include:

- Cellular Basis of Heart Failure
- Genetics and Heart Failure
- Sex and Heart Failure
- Regenerative Therapies

== In history ==
Coronary occlusion was first discussed in 1910 by Sir William Osler who discussed coronary occlusion during the Lumleian Lectures.

In 1912, James Herrick published an article in JAMA documenting his findings on coronary occlusion in animals.

According to Robert K. Massie's Nicholas and Alexandra: The Fall of the Romanov Dynasty, Tsar Nicholas II may have suffered a coronary occlusion right before he was toppled from his throne during the Russian Revolution in 1917.

Coroners cited a coronary occlusion as the cause of death for Montgomery Clift.

== See also ==
- Arterial embolism
