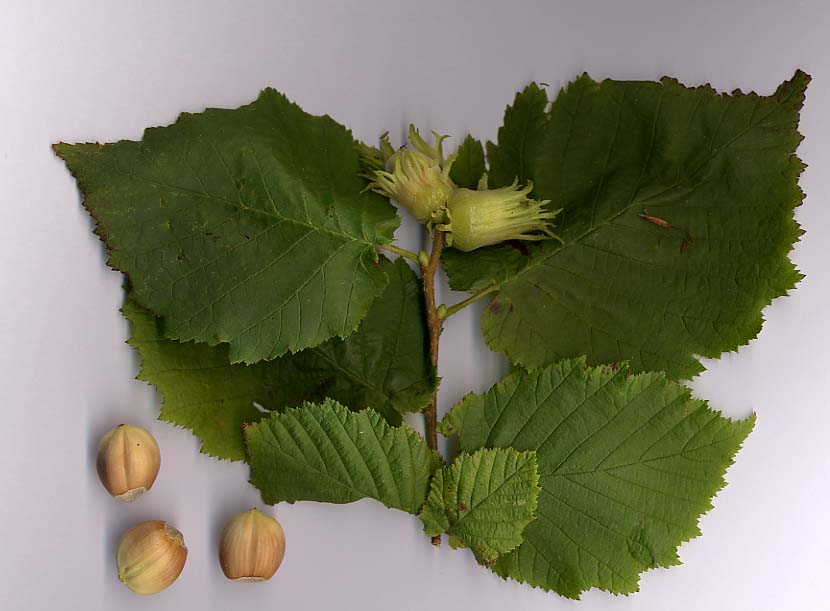
- Leaves and nuts

Conservation status
- Least Concern (IUCN 3.1)

Scientific classification
- Kingdom: Plantae
- Clade: Tracheophytes
- Clade: Angiosperms
- Clade: Eudicots
- Clade: Rosids
- Order: Fagales
- Family: Betulaceae
- Genus: Corylus
- Species: C. avellana

Binomial name
- Corylus avellana L.
- Distribution map

= Corylus avellana =

Species of tree (common hazel)

Corylus avellana, the common hazel, is a species of flowering plant in the birch family Betulaceae. The shrubs usually grow 3–8 metres (10–26 feet) tall. The nut is round, in contrast to the longer filbert nut. Common hazel is native to Europe and Western Asia.

The species is mainly cultivated for its nuts. The name 'hazelnut' applies to the nuts of any species in the genus Corylus, but in commercial contexts usually describes C. avellana. This hazelnut or cob nut (sometimes cobnut), the kernel of the seed, is edible and used raw, roasted, or ground into a paste. Historically, the shrub was an important component of the hedgerows used as field boundaries in lowland England. The wood was grown as coppice, with the poles used for wattle-and-daub building and agricultural fencing.

== Description ==
Common hazel is typically a shrub reaching 3–8 metres (10–26 feet) tall, but can reach 15 m (49 ft). The leaves are deciduous, rounded, 6–12 centimetres (2 1/2–4 1/2 inches) long and across, softly hairy on both surfaces, and with a double-serrate margin. The flowers are produced very early in spring, before the leaves, and are monoecious with single-sex wind-pollinated catkins. Male catkins are pale yellow and 5–12 cm long, while female flowers are very small and largely concealed in the buds with only the bright red 1–3 millimetres (1/16–1/8 in) long styles visible. The fruit is a nut, produced in clusters of one to five together, each nut held in a short leafy involucre ("husk") which encloses about three-quarters of the nut. The nut is roughly spherical to oval, 15–20 mm (5/8–3/4 in) long and 12–20 mm (1/2–3/4 in) broad (larger, up to 25 mm long, in some cultivated selections), yellow-brown with a pale scar at the base. The nut falls out of the involucre when ripe, about 7–8 months after pollination.

It is readily distinguished from the closely related filbert (Corylus maxima) by the short involucre; in the filbert the nut is fully enclosed by a beak-like involucre longer than the nut.

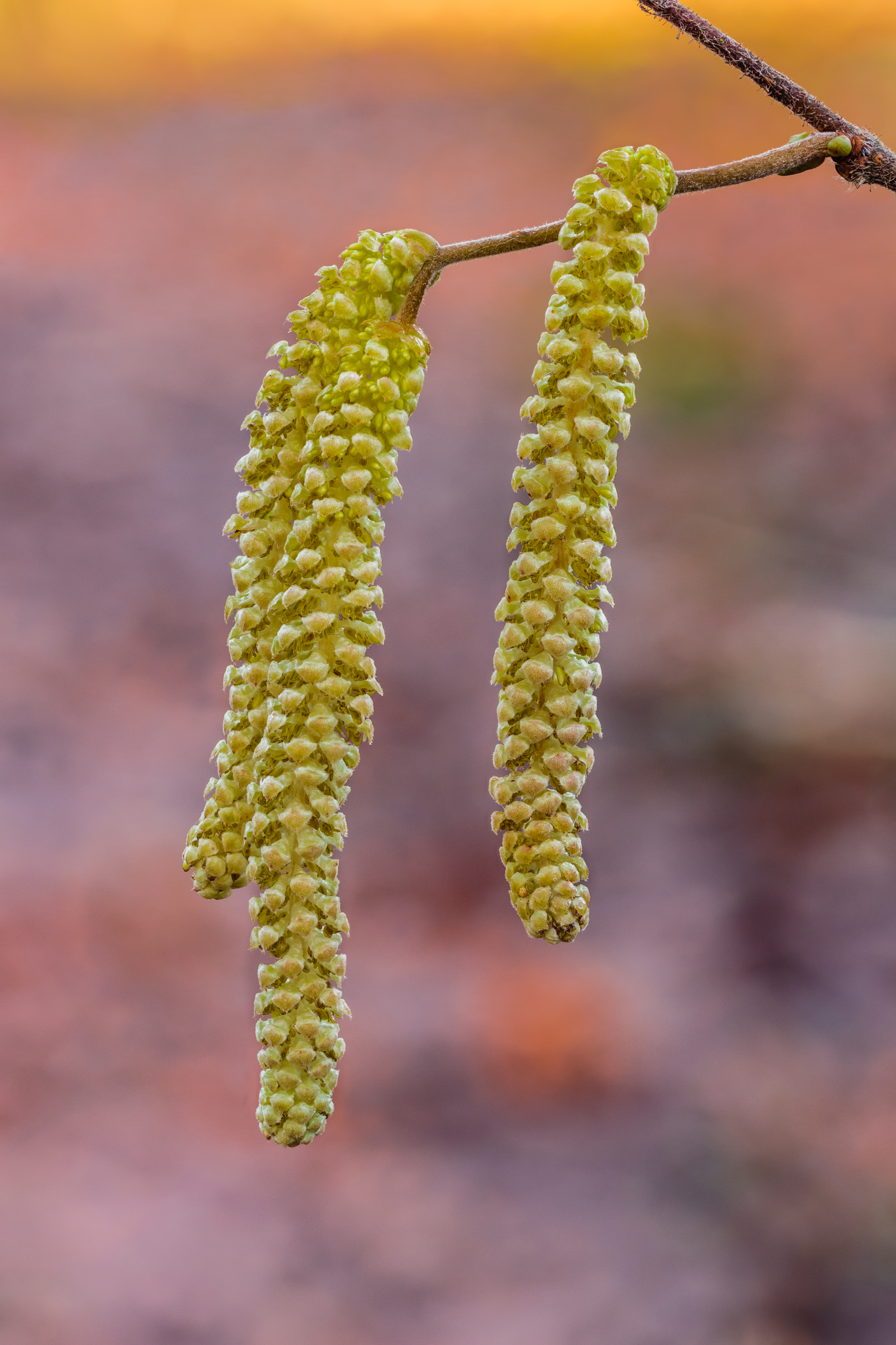
Male catkins

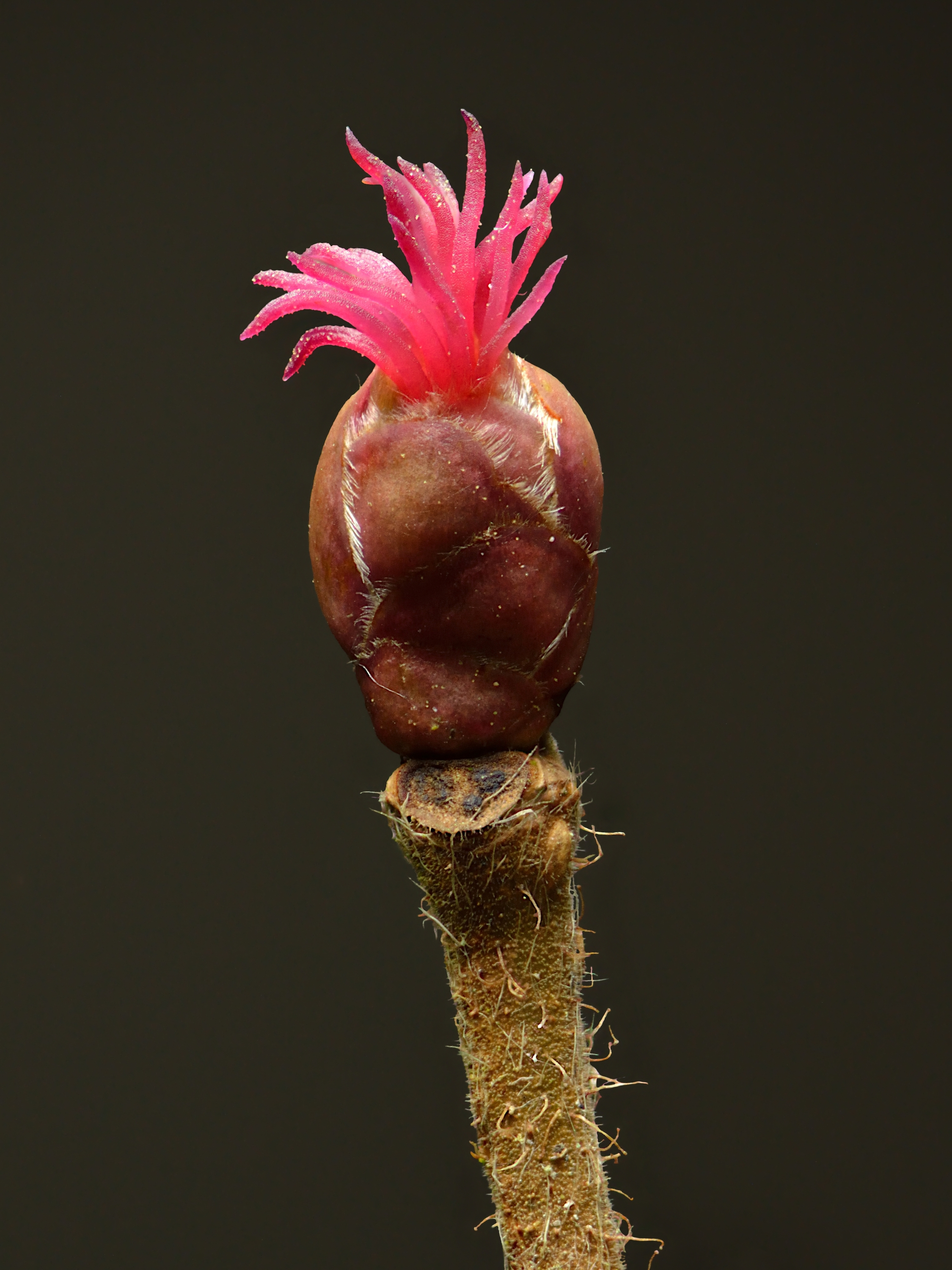
Female flower

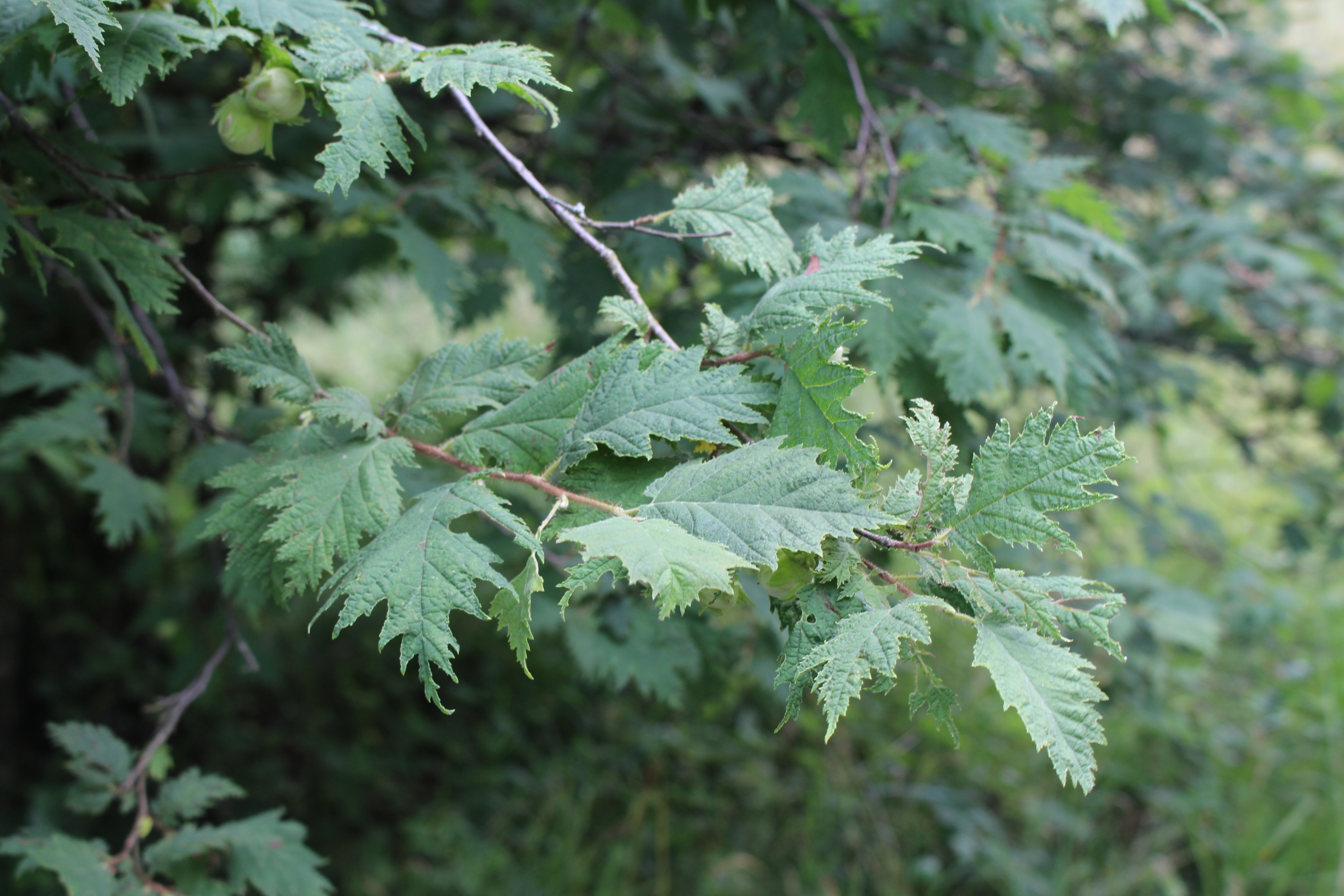
C. avellana 'Heterophylla'

== Taxonomy ==
The scientific name avellana derives from the town of Avella in Italy, and was selected by Linnaeus from Leonhart Fuchs's De historia stirpium commentarii insignes (1542), where the species was described as "Avellana nux sylvestris" ("wild nut of Avella"). That name was taken in turn from Pliny the Elder's first century A.D. encyclopedia Naturalis Historia.

== Distribution ==
Corylus avellana occurs from Ireland and the British Isles south to Iberia, Italy, Greece, Turkey and Cyprus, north to central Scandinavia, and east to the central Ural Mountains, the Caucasus, and northwestern Iran.

== Ecology ==
The leaves provide food for many animals, including Lepidoptera such as the case-bearer moth Coleophora anatipennella. Caterpillars of the concealer moth Alabonia geoffrella have been found feeding inside dead common hazel twigs.

The fruit are possibly even more important animal food, both for invertebrates adapted to circumvent the shell (usually by ovipositing in the female flowers, which also gives protection to the offspring) and for vertebrates which manage to crack them open (such as squirrels and corvids). Both are considered pests by hazelnut growers.

The roots of C. avellana are also commonly used as the host for ectomycorrhizal fungus such as Laccaria laccata (Deceiver), Russula ochroleuca (Ochre Brittlegill) and Paxillus involutus (Brown Rollrim), which are the most commonly recorded mycorrhizal fungi in Great Britain. In the Mediterranean, the Black Truffle (Tuber melanosporum) is found on the roots.

== Cultivation ==
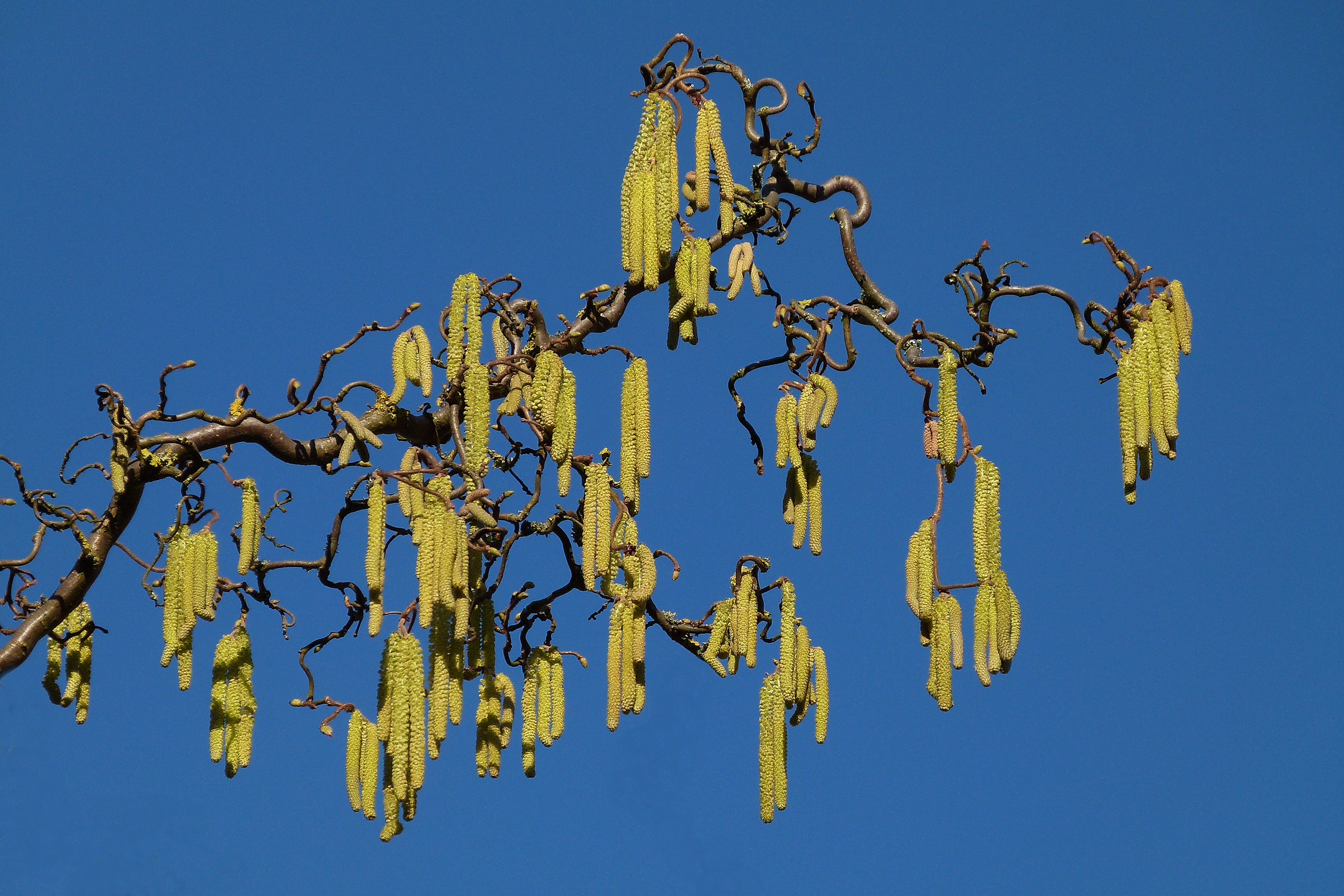
Corylus avellana 'Contorta'

There are many cultivars of Corylus avellana; by 2011 up to 400 cultivars had been named. The list of cultivars includes Barcelona, Butler, Casina, Clark Cosford, Daviana, Delle Langhe, England, Ennis, Fillbert, Halls Giant, Jemtegaard, Kent Cob, Lewis, Tokolyi, Tonda Gentile, Tonda di Giffoni, Tonda Romana, Wanliss Pride, and Willamette. It also includes Polish hazelnuts cultivars: Kataloński and Webba Cenny.

Some of these are grown for specific qualities of the nut including large nut size, and early and late fruiting cultivars, whereas other are grown as pollinators. The majority of commercial hazelnuts are propagated from root sprouts. Some cultivars are of hybrid origin between common hazel and filbert.

The following ornamental cultivars have gained the Royal Horticultural Society's Award of Garden Merit:

- 'Contorta' (corkscrew hazel, Harry Lauder's walking stick)

This variety has stems that grow in curves and spirals unlike other hazel varieties and puckered leaves. Its long elegant catkins are normal. It was discovered in a hedge in 1863 in Gloucestershire on the Frocester Court Estate and was popularised by owners of local estates such as Henry Reynolds-Moreton, 3rd Earl of Ducie and the horticulturalist Edward Augustus Bowles. It is now popular in UK gardens.

- 'Red Majestic'

This red-purple leaved variety was bred from 'Contorta' so also has a sprawling, contorted habit.

== Uses ==
According to the New Sunset Western Garden Book, the European hazelnut is among the most widely grown hazelnut plants for commercial nut production.

This shrub is common in many European woodlands. It is an important component of the hedgerows that were the traditional field boundaries in lowland England. The wood was traditionally grown as coppice, the poles cut and used for wattle-and-daub building and agricultural fencing.

=== Hazelnuts ===
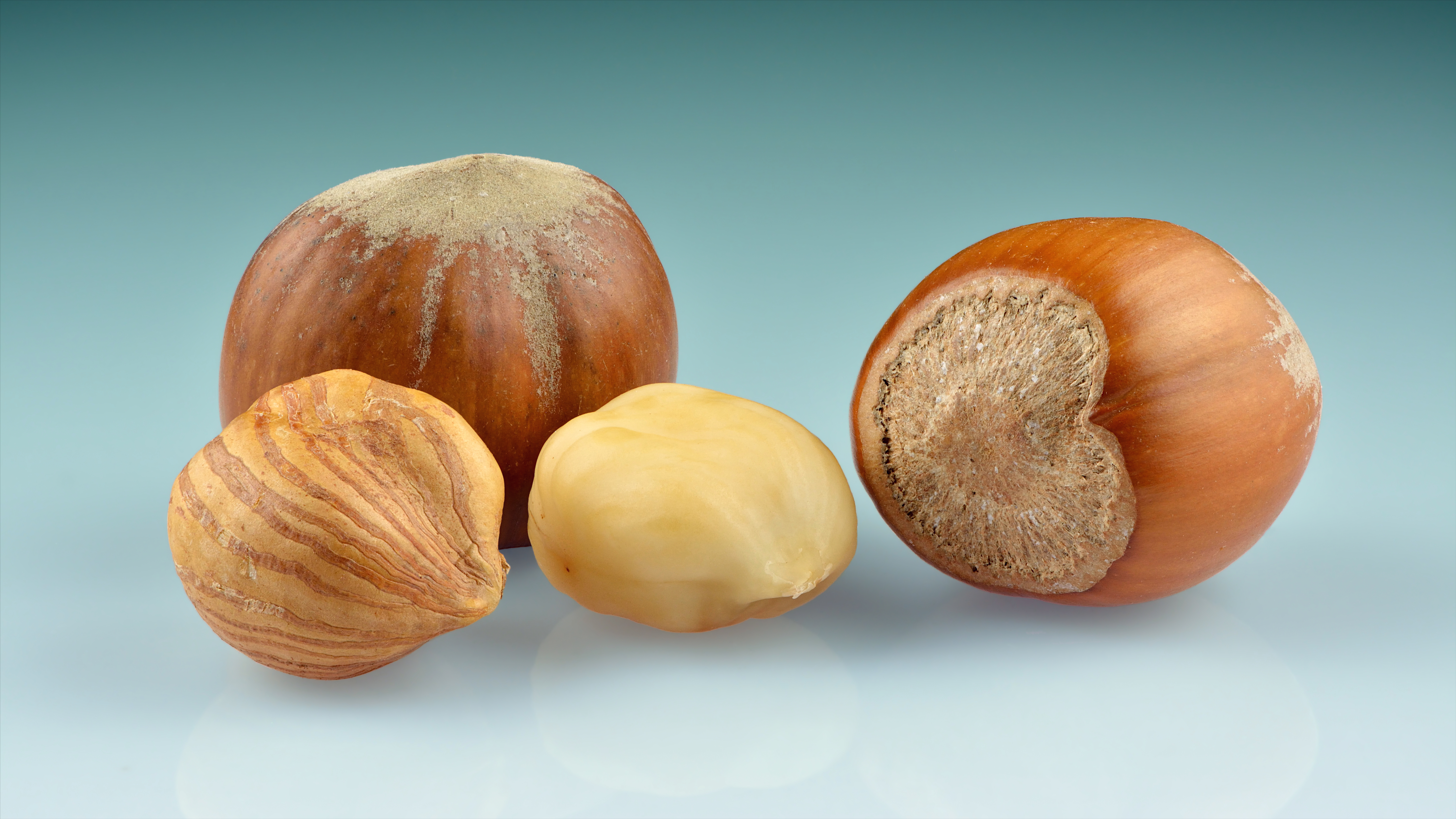
Hazelnuts

Hazelnuts are rich in protein and unsaturated fat. They also contain significant amounts of manganese, copper, vitamin E, thiamine, and magnesium.

Common hazel is cultivated for its nuts in commercial orchards in Europe, Turkey, Iran and Caucasus. The name "hazelnut" applies to the nuts of any of the several species of the genus Corylus. This hazelnut or cobnut, the kernel of the seed, is edible and used raw or roasted, or ground into a paste. The seed has a thin, dark brown skin which has a bitter flavour and is sometimes removed before cooking. The top producer of hazelnuts, by a large margin, is Turkey, specifically the Giresun Province. Turkish hazelnut production of 625,000 tonnes accounts for approximately 75% of worldwide production.

==== Biochemistry ====
In 2003, the US Food and Drug Administration recognized edible nuts as "heart healthy" foods. Frequent nut intake is associated with low risk of cardiovascular disease and cancer. The prevalent phenolics accumulates in Corylus avellana kernels and its by-products are catechin, gallic acid, sinapic acid, caffeic acid, p-coumaric acid, ferulic acid, their esters and flavonoids. Various other bioactive phenols have also been characterized in hazelnut leaves and foliar buds.

== See also ==
- Gevuina avellana (Chilean hazelnut, or Gevuina hazelnut)
