= Houndberry =

Houndberry is a common name for several plants and may refer to:

- The shrub dogwood (Cornus sanguinea), or its fruit
- The plant black nightshade (Solanum nigrum), or its fruit
