= Kirsten Finucane =

New Zealand paediatric cardiac surgeon

Kirsten Finucane CNZM ONZM
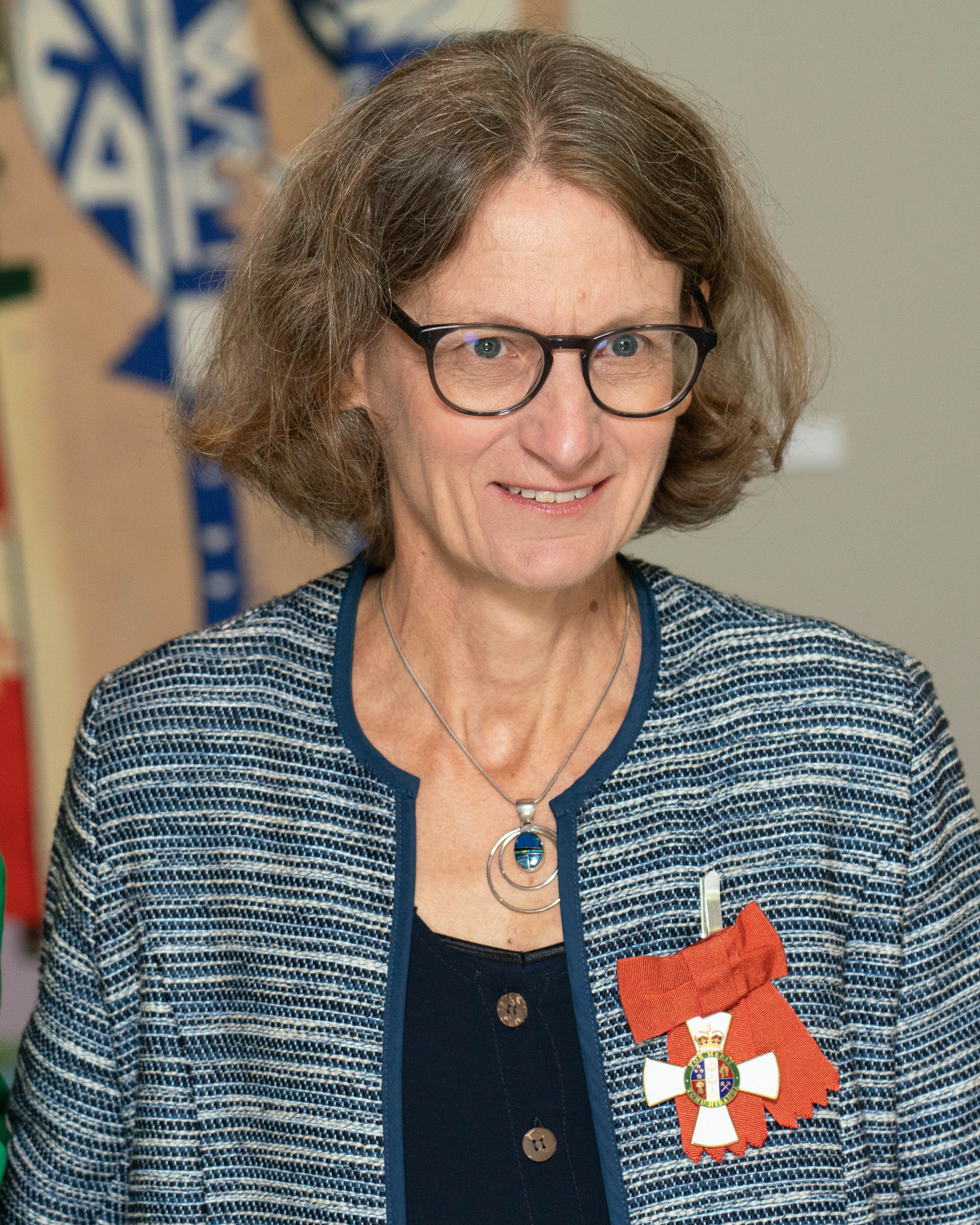
- Awards: Companion of the New Zealand Order of Merit

Academic background
- Education: Epsom Girls' Grammar School, University of Auckland

Annabel Kirsten Finucane CNZM ONZM is a New Zealand paediatric heart surgeon, and was Chief Surgeon of the Paediatric and Congenital Cardiac Service at Starship Hospital in Auckland for twenty years. In 2009 Finucane was appointed an Officer of the New Zealand Order of Merit for services to medicine, in particular paediatric heart surgery. In 2021 Finucane was appointed a Companion of the New Zealand Order of Merit for services to health, particularly paediatric heart surgery.

== Early life and education ==
Finucane was educated at Epsom Girls Grammar School, and then completed a medical degree at the University of Auckland. She trained in New Zealand and the UK. Finucane didn't initially intend to study medicine, and then when she did, did not intend to be a paediatric surgeon. She was advised by other surgeons that it would not be possible to have a family and work as a surgeon, and additionally she used to faint at the sight of blood. During three months spent working in Nepal she realised she no longer fainted, and was able to train as a paediatric surgeon at Green Lane Hospital.

== Career ==
Finucane was Chief Surgeon of the Paediatric and Congenital Cardiac Service at Starship Hospital in Auckland for almost 20 years, retiring in 2024. She performed over 7500 surgeries in the course of her career. During her tenure, the hospital's "heart library", a collection of stored hearts used for training and research, was found to have hearts that had been obtained without proper parental consent. Finucane attributed the problem to both changes in public expectations around consent since the collection began, and to under resourced medical staff working under pressure.

Finucane helped establish the Hearts 4 Kids Trust in 2015. The trust coordinates and funds annual team visits to Fiji to provide heart surgery for babies and children from Samoa, Vanuatu, Fiji, Tuvalu, and Kiribati. The medical staff are volunteers who spend a week of their leave to the scheme.

== Honours and awards ==
In the 2009 Queen's Birthday Honours, Finucane was appointed an Officer of the New Zealand Order of Merit for services to medicine, in particular paediatric heart surgery.

In the 2021 New Year Honours Finucane was appointed a Companion of the New Zealand Order of Merit for services to health, particularly paediatric heart surgery. In 2023 Finucane was awarded the Distinguished Alumna Award by the University of Auckland.

== Personal life ==
Finucane is married with three children.

== Selected works ==
- John Beca; Julia K. Gunn; Lee Coleman; Ayton Hope; Peter W. Reed; Hunt, Rodney; Finucane, Kirsten Annabel; Christian Brizard; Brieana Dance; Lara S Shekerdemian (2013). "New white matter brain injury after infant heart surgery is associated with diagnostic group and the use of circulatory arrest". Circulation. 127 (9): 971–979. doi:10.1161/circulationaha.112.001089. PMID 23371931. Wikidata Q47640062.
- Cormack, Barbara Elizabeth; Wilson, Nigel John; Finucane, Kirsten Annabel; Teena M West (2004). "Use of Monogen for pediatric postoperative chylothorax". The Annals of Thoracic Surgery. 77 (1): 301–305. doi:10.1016/s0003-4975(03)01189-5. PMID 14726083. Wikidata Q35630389.
- Cynthia Ortinau; Inder, Terrie; Jennifer Lambeth; Michael Wallendorf; Finucane, Kirsten Annabel; John Beca (2012). "Congenital heart disease affects cerebral size but not brain growth". Pediatric Cardiology. 33 (7): 1138–1146. doi:10.1007/s00246-012-0269-9. PMC 3702162. PMID 22450354. Wikidata Q36984676.
- Bo Remenyi; Webb, Rachel; Gentles, Thomas L.; Peter Russell; Finucane, Kirsten Annabel; Mildred Lee; Wilson, Nigel John (2013). "Improved long-term survival for rheumatic mitral valve repair compared to replacement in the young". World Journal for Pediatric and Congenital Heart Surgery. 4 (2): 155–164. doi:10.1177/2150135112474024. PMID 23799728. Wikidata Q38116944.
- Julia K. Gunn; John Beca; Daniel J. Penny; Stephen B. Horton; Yves A. d'Udekem; Christian P Brizard; Finucane, Kirsten Annabel; Monika Olischar; Hunt, Rodney; Lara S Shekerdemian (2011). "Amplitude-integrated electroencephalography and brain injury in infants undergoing Norwood-type operations". The Annals of Thoracic Surgery. 93 (1): 170–176. doi:10.1016/j.athoracsur.2011.08.014. PMID 22075220. Wikidata Q82462142.
- Eckersley, Luke; Lynn Sadler; Emma Parry; Finucane, Kirsten Annabel; Gentles, Thomas L. (2015). "Timing of diagnosis affects mortality in critical congenital heart disease". Archives of Disease in Childhood. 101 (6): 516–520. doi:10.1136/archdischild-2014-307691. PMID 26130379. Wikidata Q38541143.
- Sharon H Wong; Finucane, Kirsten Annabel; Kerr, Alan Ronald; O'Donnell, Clare P.; Teena West; Gentles, Thomas L. (2007). "Cardiac outcome up to 15 years after the arterial switch operation". Heart, Lung and Circulation. 17 (1): 48–53. doi:10.1016/j.hlc.2007.06.523. PMID 17669687. Wikidata Q36899387.
