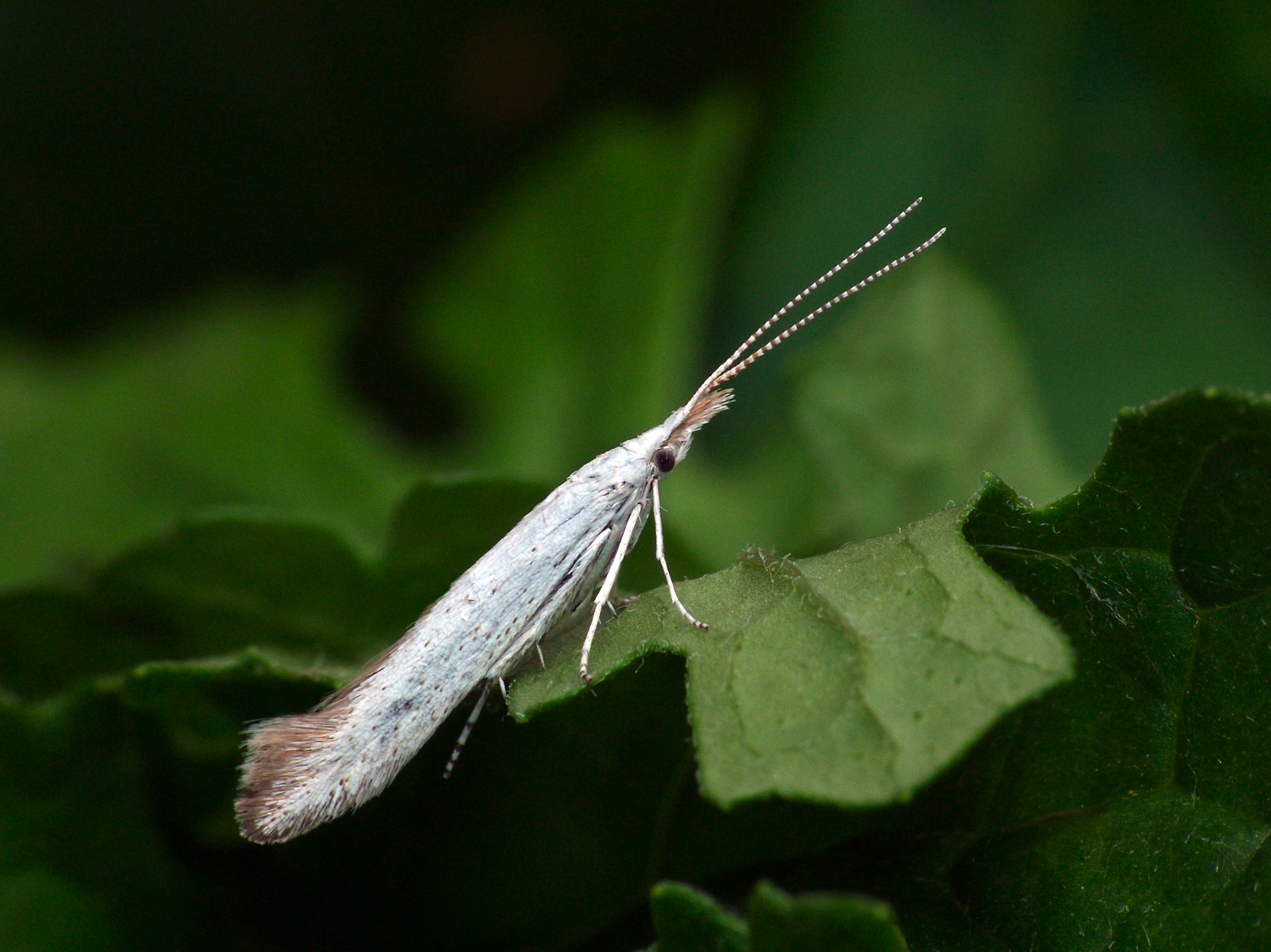
- Coleophora anatipennella female Windmill Hill, Worcestershire, England
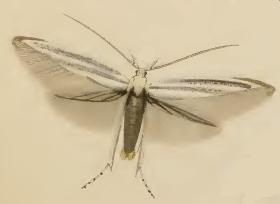

Scientific classification
- Kingdom: Animalia
- Phylum: Arthropoda
- Clade: Pancrustacea
- Class: Insecta
- Order: Lepidoptera
- Family: Coleophoridae
- Genus: Coleophora
- Species: C. anatipennella

Binomial name
- Coleophora anatipennella (Hübner, 1796)

Synonyms
- List: Coleophora anatipenella (lapsus); Coleophora tiliella Zeller, 1849; Tinea anatipenella Hübner, 1796; Tinea anatipenella (lapsus); Tinea bernoulliella Goeze, 1783 (but see text); Porrectaria anatipennis Haworth, 1828; Coleophora anatipennella var. obscurella Krulikovskij, 1909; Coleophora albidella Pierce & Metcalfe, 1935; Coleophora ringoniella Oku, 1965; Coleophora malivorella Matsumura, 1905

= Coleophora anatipennella =

Species of moth

Coleophora anatipennella is a moth of the case-bearer family (Coleophoridae).

== Taxonomy ==
It was described by Jacob Hübner in 1796. It is the type species of its genus (Coleophora) and, via that, of its family.

It is not completely understood to what moth Johann August Ephraim Goeze's 1783 description of the supposedly distinct C. bernoulliella refers to, but it is presumed to be the same species as C. anatipennella.

== Description ==
Larva

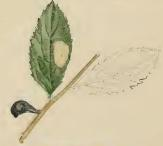
Sloe twig with leaf eaten by the larva and a case attached to the stem

The wingspan is 14–16 mm (0.55–0.63 in). Head white. Antennae white, ringed with pale brownish. Basal joint with rather long tuft. Forewings white, posteriorly sprinkled with brownish. Costal cilia without dark line. Hindwings rather dark grey.

== Range and ecology ==
C. anatipennella is found in Europe eastwards to the Ural Mountains; southeastwards its range extends across Asia Minor to Iran. It has also been recorded from Japan.

The caterpillars feed mainly on the leaves of Rosaceae and Fagales trees, as well as some others. Recorded host plants are:

- eurosids I: Rosales: Rosaceae
  - Crataegus (hawthorns)
  - Malus domestica (apple), and possibly other Malus
  - Prunus (cherries, plums and peaches), including wild cherry (Prunus avium), blackthorn (Prunus spinosa), and possibly others
  - Pyrus communis (European pear)
  - Sorbus aucuparia (European rowan), and possibly other Sorbus
- eurosids I: Fagales: Betulaceae
  - Alnus (alders)
  - Betula (birches)
  - Carpinus betulus (European hornbeam)
  - Corylus avellana (common hazel)
- eurosids I: Fagales: Fagaceae
  - Castanea sativa (sweet chestnut)
  - Quercus (oaks)
- eurosids I: Malpighiales: Salicaceae
  - Salix (willows)
- eurosids II: Malvales: Malvaceae
  - Tilia (limes)
- Basal asterids: Cornales: Cornaceae
  - Cornus sanguinea (common dogwood)
