= World Journal for Pediatric and Congenital Heart Surgery =

- Discipline: Cardiovascular surgery in pediatrics
- Language: English
- Edited by: Marshall Jacobs

Publication details
- History: 2010-present
- Publisher: SAGE Publications
- Frequency: Bimonthly

Standard abbreviations
- ISO 4: World J. Pediatr. Congenit. Heart Surg.

Indexing
- ISSN: 2150-1351
- OCLC no.: 428974449

Links
- Journal homepage; Online access; Online archive

The World Journal for Pediatric and Congenital Heart Surgery is a bimonthly peer-reviewed medical journal covering the field of cardiovascular surgery in pediatrics. The editor-in-chief is Marshall Jacobs (Johns Hopkins School of Medicine). The journal was established in 2010 and is published by SAGE Publications and is an official journal of the World Society for Pediatric and Congenital Heart Surgery, the Congenital Heart Surgeons' Society, and the European Congenital Heart Surgeons Association.

== Abstracting and indexing ==
The journal is abstracted and indexed in MEDLINE, CINAHL, and ProQuest databases.
