= Microinfarct =

A microinfarct is a microscopic stroke generally ranging between 0.1 millimeter and 1 millimeter in size. Microinfarcts can be found in 25-50% of all elderly deceased persons. Microinfarcts may be the second most important cause of dementia, after Alzheimer's disease.

Microinfarcts are microscopic lesions, of cellular death or tissue necrosis, which are a result of pathologies involving small vessels. Such pathologies are arteriosclerosis or cerebral amyloid angiopathy. Microinfarcts take longer to affect neuronal death progress, at up to 28 days, rather than hours.

This ailment usually goes undetected in clinical-radiological, like structural MRI, studies and is known as a “silent pathology”. Depending on the size, large acute microinfarcts may be detected via a special imaging technique known as diffusion weighted imaging.

Microinfarcts tend to occur at a high frequency, without specific regionalized locations. They are common in aging brains. This high frequency is thought to directly disrupt cognitive networks that are imperative to brain operation. Even though microinfarcts are usually undetectable, there is a general assessment of the cognitive status measured on a scale called the Clinical Dementia Rating (CDR). Performance on this scale is associated with integrity of white matter, periventricular myelination, and cortical microinfarcts. Assessments of cortical microinfarcts have had the highest rates with being associated with cognitive degeneration. This lower cognition specifically affects perceptual speed and memory (semantic and episodic). People with high frequency of this ailment tend to have greater chances of developing dementia.

Although not many studies have been conducted and little is known about microinfarcts and other vascular or epidemiological risk factors, these brain lesions are thought to be masked by other pathologies. However, the common macroscopic infarct is not exhibited in 45% of people tested for microinfarcts.
