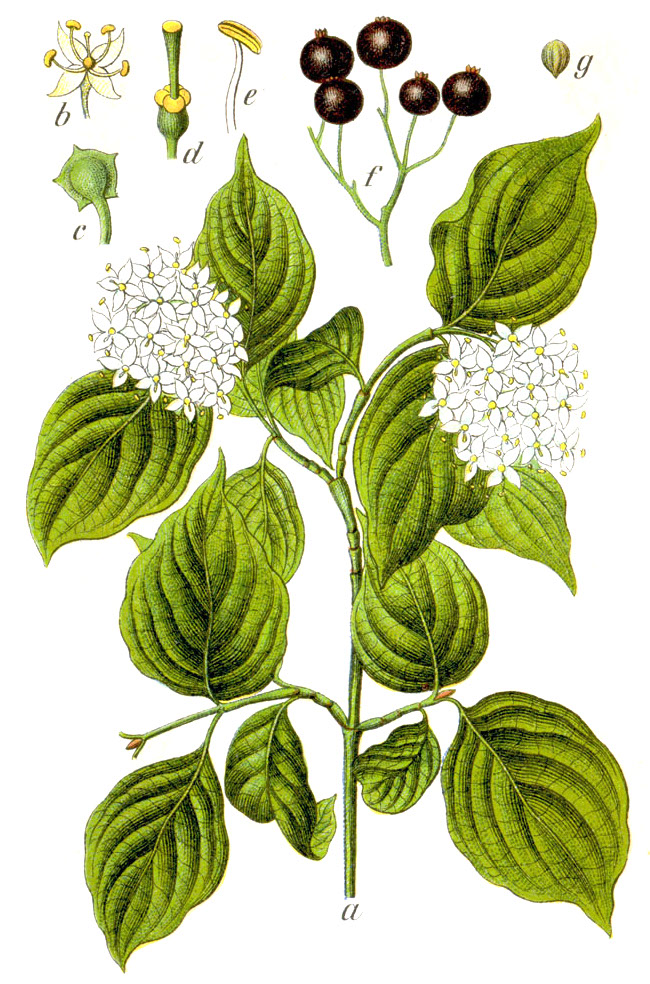
- Common dogwood

Scientific classification
- Kingdom: Plantae
- Clade: Tracheophytes
- Clade: Angiosperms
- Clade: Eudicots
- Clade: Asterids
- Order: Cornales
- Family: Cornaceae
- Genus: Cornus
- Subgenus: Cornus subg. Kraniopsis
- Species: C. sanguinea

Binomial name
- Cornus sanguinea L.
- Distribution map

Synonyms
- Swida sanguinea

= Cornus sanguinea =

Common dogwood

Species of tree

Cornus sanguinea, the common dogwood or bloody dogwood, is a species of dogwood native to most of Europe and western Asia, from England and central Scotland east to the Caspian Sea. It is widely grown as an ornamental plant.

== Description ==
It is a medium to large deciduous shrub, growing 2–6 metres (7–20 ft) tall, with dark greenish-brown branches and twigs. The leaves are opposite, 4–8 centimetres (2–3 in) long and 2–4 centimetres (0.8–1.6 in) broad, with an ovate to oblong shape and an entire margin; they are green above, slightly paler below, and rough with short stiff pubescence. The hermaphrodite flowers are small, 5–10 millimetres (0.2–0.4 in) diameter, with four creamy white petals, produced in clusters 3–5 centimetres (1–2 in) diameter, and are insect pollinated. The fruit is a globose black berry 5–8 millimetres (0.2–0.3 in) diameter, containing a single seed. The berries are sometimes called "dogberries".

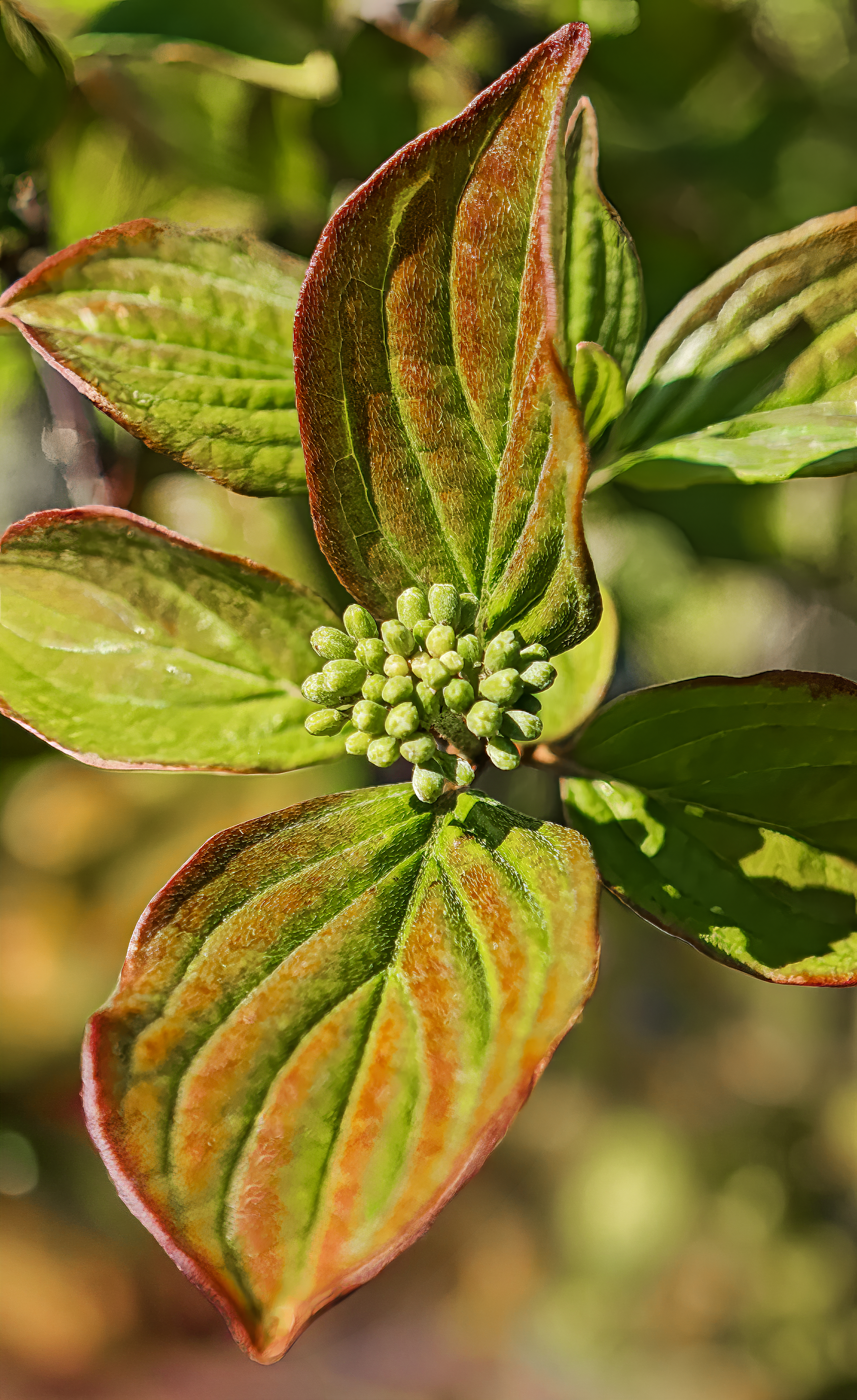
'Cornus sanguinea' immature inflorescence

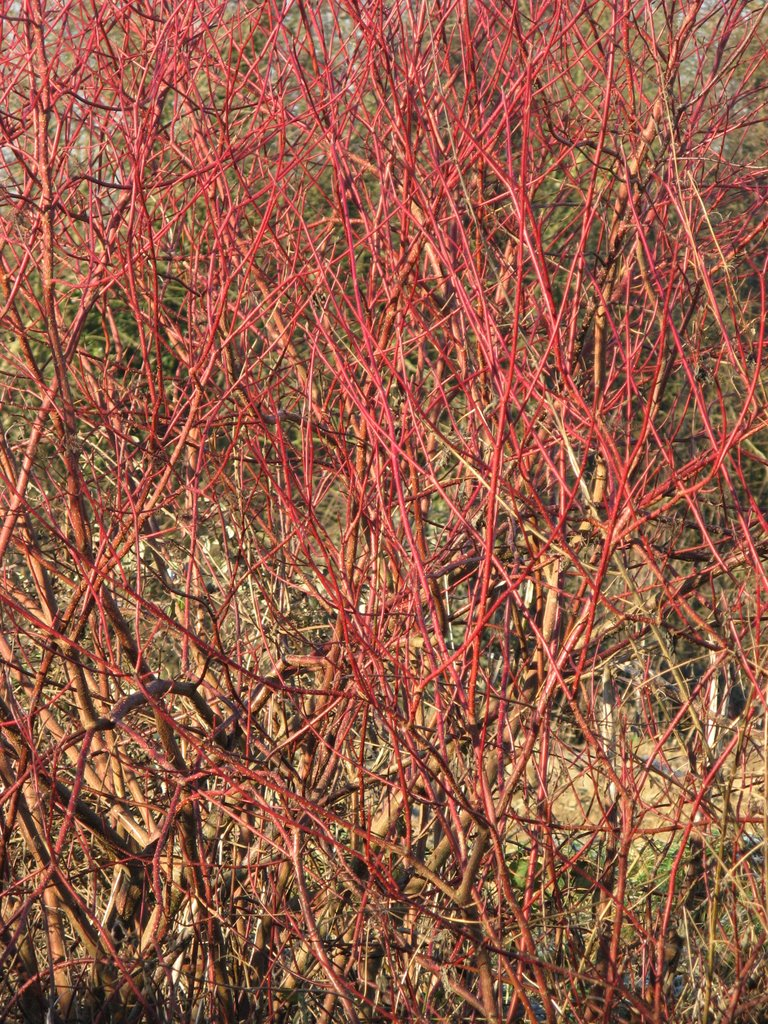
Cornus sanguinea stems in winter.

== Ecology ==
It prefers moderate warmth in sunny places, though it can tolerate shade and in the more southern areas of its distribution area grows in the mountains. In cooler areas such as Scandinavia it grows at sea level.

It requires light, often alkaline soils. The species spreads by seeds and stolons. Its natural range covers most of Europe and western Asia. It is especially abundant in riversides, especially in shady areas and ravines. It grows in the margins of forests or unforested areas as woods in regeneration, prickly woodland fringes, with other thorny shrub species (for example, Clematis vitalba, Crataegus monogyna, Malus sylvestris, Prunus spinosa, Rubus idaeus or Rubus ulmifolius).

It reproduces by seed and root sprouts, which makes it effective at occupying areas of land and forming dense groves. Depending on circumstances, it can be invasive.

== Uses ==
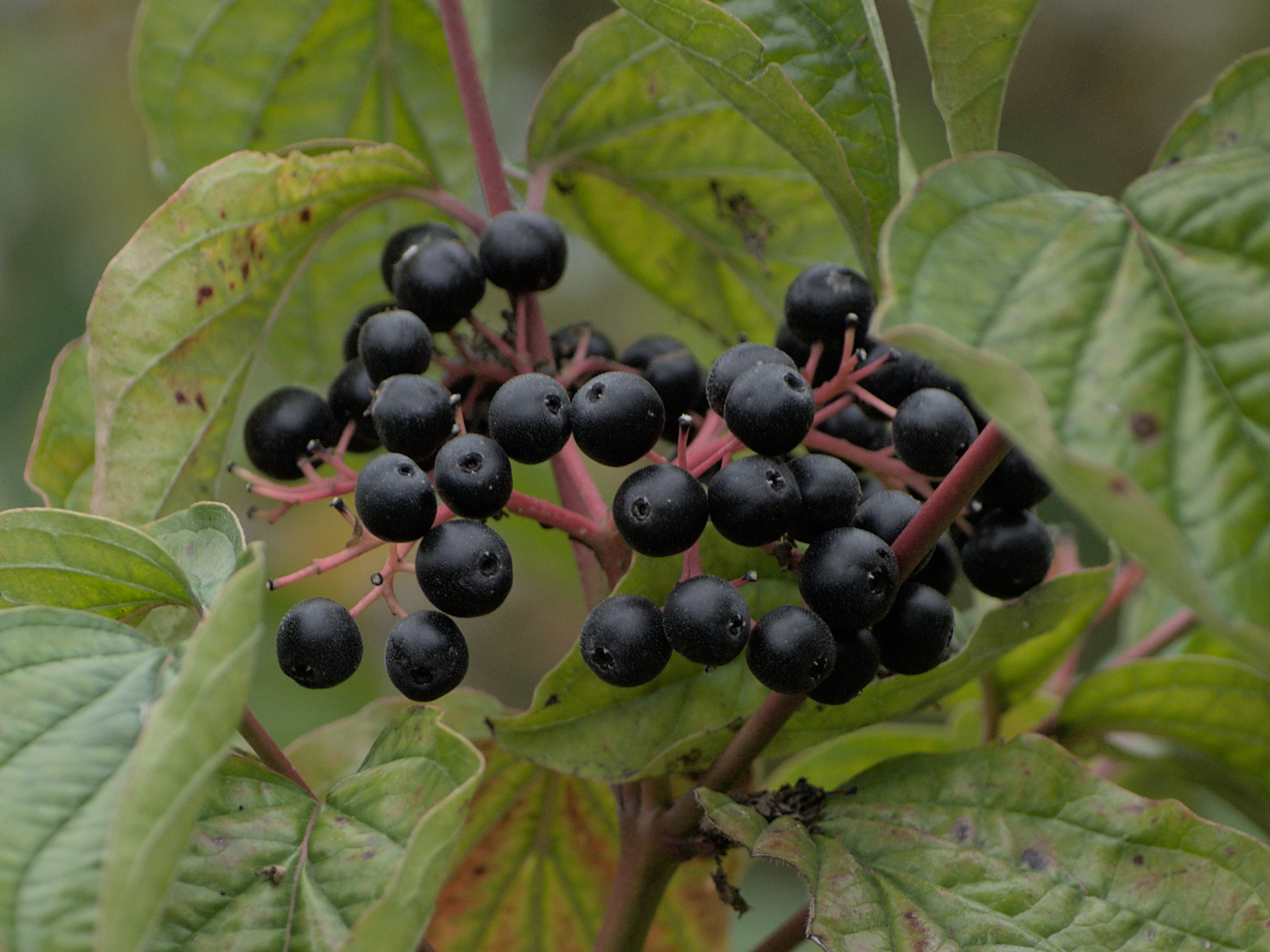
Cornus sanguinea berries

The leaves provide food for some animals, including Lepidoptera such as the case-bearer moth Coleophora anatipennella. Dogberries are eaten by some mammals and many birds. Many frugivorous passerines find them simply irresistible, and prefer them over fruits grown by humans. The plant is thus often grown in organic gardening and permaculture to prevent harm to orchard crops, while benefiting from the fact that even frugivorous birds will hunt pest insects during the breeding season, as their young require much protein to grow.

Garden varieties are often called "winter fire" because the leaves turn orange-yellow in autumn and then fall to reveal striking red winter stems.

The straight woody shoots produced by the plant can be used as prods, skewers or arrows. The prehistoric archer known as Ötzi the Iceman, discovered in 1991 on the border between Italy and Austria, was carrying arrow shafts made from dogwood. The common name, dogwood, comes from C. sanguinea, the wood of which Northern Europeans frequently used to make treenails ("dags"), dowels, and pegs prior to the industrial revolution. The wood of C. sanguinea is unusually hard, dense, and tough and has an oily finish which aids in driving pegs into holes.
