= Anomalous aortic origin of a coronary artery =

Anomalous Aortic Origin of a Coronary Artery (AAOCA)
- Anomalous origin of the right coronary artery from the left coronary sinus on MRI with an inter-arterial, potentially dangerous course.
- Specialty: Medical genetics

Anomalous aortic origin of a coronary artery (AAOCA) is a rare congenital heart defect in which a coronary artery inappropriately arises from the aorta, usually from the incorrect sinus of Valsalva. This anomalous coronary artery often takes an interarterial (between the aorta and pulmonary artery), intraconal (within the myocardium), or intramural course (within the aortic wall), and is associated with an increased risk of sudden death in children.

== Cause ==
The AAOCA is a rare birth defect in the heart that occurs when a coronary artery arises from the wrong location on the main blood vessel, the aorta.

Children and young adults with these defects can die suddenly, especially during or just after exercise. In fact, AAOCA is the second leading cause of sudden cardiac death in children and adolescents in the United States behind hypertrophic cardiomyopathy. The prevalence is estimated at 0.1% to 0.3% of the general population. Neither the true risk of sudden death nor the best way to treat these patients is known with certainty. Because of the risk of sudden death, doctors face the pressure to "do something", but in the absence of long-term follow-up data, the risks and benefits of different management options are unconfirmed.

== Treatment ==
Surgical intervention is indicated for coronary artery abnormalities in symptomatic patients with AAOCA (particularly with origin of the LCA from the right sinus), such as those with serious ventricular tachyarrhythmias or documented myocardial ischemia. There are no controlled studies which have evaluated the outcome of intervention in asymptomatic individuals.

The indications for intervention in asymptomatic patients with AAOCA with an intramural course are debated, especially with AAOCA RCA from the left sinus of Valsalva. Generally refer asymptomatic patients with left coronary artery arising from the right coronary sinus for surgical repair.

Asymptomatic patients with the right coronary artery arising from the left sinus are managed on a case-by-case basis.

== Research ==
In 2009, The Congenital Heart Surgeons' Society (CHSS) established a North American Registry in order to study a large multi-institutional cohort of patients with AAOCA. This initiative is intended to generate new knowledge concerning the natural history of AAOCA, to describe the outcomes of surgical intervention versus observation in children and young adults with AAOCA, and to generate evidence to support risk stratification among patients with AAOCA and eventually suggest evidence-based guidelines for management.

Patients who are diagnosed with AAOCA at or before age 30 years are eligible for this study. They should have otherwise normal heart or only minor defects such as Atrial septal defect, Ventricular septal defect, Patent ductus arteriosus, bicuspid aortic valve, mild pulmonary stenosis, etc.

Patients who have other major heart problems that require operations are currently not included in this Cohort study. Any other problems with coronary arteries are also not included.

=== Current status ===
The Registry has been enrolling new patients from participating institutions that are member of the Congenital Heart Surgeons' Society. Hospitals from across North America continue to join the study group and enroll patients. Over 140 patients with AAOCA have been enrolled by June 2011, making it the largest cohort ever assembled of this anomaly.

=== ARCAPA ===
Anomalous origin of the right coronary artery originating from the pulmonary trunk (ARCAPA) is a rare but potentially fatal anomaly. The goal of surgical therapy is establishment of a physiologic bi-coronary circulation.
