= Congenital Heart Surgeons' Society =

- Founded: mid 1950s
- Founder: cardiac surgeons
- Purpose: congenital heart defects
- Location: 500 Cummings Center, Suite 4400, Beverly, MA, 01915, United States
- Website: Official Website

Congenital Heart Surgeons' Society (CHSS) is a professional membership organization of heart surgeons who specialize in treating congenital heart defects. The society is a non-profit organization registered in the United States.

== History and mission ==
The history of the group goes back to the early days of cardiac surgery in the mid 1950s, when 16 surgeons met annually to relate their early pioneering experience in operating on children with congenital heart defects. The CHSS' purpose is to associate persons interested in, and carry on activities related to, the science and practice of congenital heart surgery. It also strives to encourage and stimulate investigation and study with an aim to increase the knowledge of congenital cardiac physiology, pathology and therapy, and to correlate and disseminate such knowledge.

== Membership ==
Congenital Heart Surgeons who have a significant interest in congenital heart surgery may apply for membership in the Congenital Heart Surgeons' Society (CHSS). There are three types of membership in the CHSS: Active, Emeritus and Honorary. Currently the CHSS has over 140 member surgeons from more than 70 hospitals.

== Research activities ==
In 1985 Dr. John Kirklin and Dr. Eugene Blackstone proposed that the centers pool their experience and data in managing infants with rare congenital anomalies of the heart. Data collection required the establishment of a Data Center, initially in Birmingham, Alabama. In 1997, the Data Center moved to The Hospital for Sick Children in Toronto, Canada. The CHSS sponsors and oversees multi-institutional clinical studies evaluating the application of surgical interventions in congenital heart disease.

The mission of the Data Center is to improve care for patients with congenital heart disease through collaborative research. Some of the CHSS studies involve treatment of heart defects like the transposition of the great arteries, congenital valvular heart disease, coarctation of aorta, hypoplastic left heart syndrome, anomalous aortic origin of a coronary artery among others. Approximately 6000 patients have participated in CHSS research studies, of which about 4000 patients are being actively followed by the Data Center. The CHSS also collaborates with other professional organizations to advance care of the children with heart diseases. They include Society of Thoracic Surgeons, European Association of Congenital Heart Surgeons, etc.

== See also ==
- Anomalous aortic origin of a coronary artery
