= Cardiac diet =

Diet aiding cardiovascular health

A cardiac diet also known as a heart healthy diet is a diet that is focused on reducing sodium and fat and cholesterol intake. The diet concentrates on reducing "foods containing saturated fats and trans fats" and substituting them with "mono and polyunsaturated fats". The diet advocates increasing intake of "complex carbohydrates, soluble fiber and omega 3 fatty acids" and is recommended for people with cardiovascular disease or people looking for a healthier diet.

The diet limits the intake of meat, dairy products, egg products, certain desserts and caffeine. The cardiac diet emphasizes a fruit and vegetable based diet. Foods such as spinach, cauliflower, broccoli, tomatoes, bok choy, arugula, bell peppers, and carrots are recommended. Fiber is also recommended, foods such as oats, beans, ground flaxseed and berries are advised. A healthy cardiac diet "allows for an estimated 25–30% of total calories from fat" mostly from mono and polyunsaturated fats. Since 2006, the American Heart Association have been "substantially more stringent on saturated fat intake". Besides the diet recommended by the American Heart Association, a Mediterranean diet or ovo-lacto vegetarianism are also viable.

Commercial cardiac diets are also available for pets such as cats and dogs with cardiovascular health issues.
