= Cutting balloon =

Medical device

A cutting balloon is an angioplasty device invented by Barath et al. used in percutaneous coronary interventions. It has a special balloon tip with small blades, that are activated when the balloon is inflated. This procedure is different from Rotoblation (Percutaneous Transluminal Rotational Atherectomy or PCRA) whereby a diamond tipped device spins at high revolutions to cut away calcific (chalky) atheroma usually prior to coronary stenting. Boston Scientific's Flextome is the most widely used cutting balloon.

Cutting balloons have also been used in the treatment of refractory or recurrent laryngotracheal stenosis, particularly in cases where a dense ring of circumferential fibrosis has formed in the trachea or either bronchus'.
