= MicroPort =

Multinational medical technology manufacturer

MicroPort Inc.
- Type: Public
- Traded as: SEHK: 853
- Industry: Medical Devices
- Founded: 1998
- Headquarters: Shanghai, Irvine, Clamart
- Key people: Zhaohua Chang, CEO; Jonathan Chen, Co-CEO; Martin Sun, CFO
- Revenue: ▲US$793.493Million (2019 Annual)
- Operating income: ▲US$564.425 Million (2019 Annual)
- Net income: ▲US$29.009 Million (2019 Annual)
- Number of employees: 9000 (2022)
- Website: www.microport.com

MicroPort is a multinational medical technology company with headquarters in Shanghai; Irvine, California; and Clamart, France. The company designs and produces medical devices across multiple therapeutic areas including interventional cardiology, orthopedics, cardiac rhythm management, electrophysiology, neurovascular intervention, structural heart disease, surgical robotics, and critical care.

MicroPort completed its initial public offering on the Hong Kong Stock Exchange in 2010 and has since established multiple specialized subsidiaries focused on distinct therapeutic areas, with several completing separate public listings. Recognized as one of the global Medtech Big 100 companies, MicroPort's coronary intervention products have been implanted in over 10 million patients globally since its founding, with devices distributed globally in over 90 countries across.

== History ==
=== Founding and early coronary stent business (1998–2010) ===
MicroPort was founded in 1998 in Shanghai by Zhaohua Chang and a team of engineers. The company initially focused on interventional cardiology devices, developing coronary balloons, catheters, and drug-eluting stents for the Chinese healthcare market.

During the 2000s, MicroPort developed successive generations of drug-eluting stents, including the Firebird platform launched in 2004 and the Firebird2 platform that followed. By the end of the decade, the company had established itself as a leading domestic supplier of interventional cardiovascular devices in China with approximately 40% domestic market share. During this first decade, MicroPort also began expanding internationally with distribution into other Asian markets including Japan.

In September 2010, MicroPort completed its initial public offering on the Hong Kong Stock Exchange (stock code: 00853.HK), raising capital to fund expansion of its product development pipeline and international operations.

In 2014, MicroPort received regulatory approval in China for its Firehawk stent system, followed by a CE Mark in Europe in 2015. The Firehawk platform features a unique abluminal groove-filled design that delivers sirolimus using a biodegradable polymer, with a lower drug and polymer load compared to contemporary drug-eluting stents. Clinical outcomes were evaluated in the TARGET trial series, which demonstrated non-inferiority to conventional drug-eluting stents and superiority in certain clinical contexts.

MicroPort also began development of Firesorb, a bioresorbable vascular scaffold, in the mid-2010s during a period when the broader industry was reassessing bioresorbable vascular scaffold technology as a whole. Following clinical setbacks with first-generation scaffolds, including Abbott's withdrawal of its Absorb device from global markets in 2017 and Boston Scientific's halt of its bioresorbable scaffold program the same year, MicroPort continued investment in a next-generation bioresorbable technology.

=== International expansion and acquisitions (2010s) ===
Beginning in the 2010s, MicroPort pursued a diversification strategy, expanding from its core coronary intervention business into orthopedics, cardiac rhythm management (CRM), and endovascular therapies through a combination of organic development and strategic acquisitions in North America and Europe.

In January 2014, MicroPort acquired Wright Medical's OrthoRecon business for approximately $290 million, establishing MicroPort Orthopedics with headquarters and manufacturing operations in Arlington, Tennessee. The acquisition included a portfolio of hip and knee reconstruction implants and positioned MicroPort among the top ten global orthopedic device manufacturers by revenue. MicroPort Orthopedics subsequently expanded operations into additional markets including India and other Asia-Pacific countries.

MicroPort entered the CRM sector through a strategic collaboration with the Sorin Group announced in January 2014, establishing a joint venture focused on developing and commercializing CRM devices including pacemakers and implantable cardioverter-defibrillators. In April 2018, MicroPort acquired LivaNova's CRM business for approximately €190 million (US$230 million), consolidating its CRM operations with global headquarters and manufacturing facilities in Clamart, France. The acquisition included an established portfolio of pacemakers, defibrillators, and cardiac resynchronization therapy devices with regulatory approvals in Europe and other international markets.

In May 2018, MicroPort acquired the operations of Lombard Medical Technologies, a UK-based manufacturer of endovascular stent-graft systems. The acquisition added established abdominal and thoracic aortic stent-graft platforms to MicroPort's vascular portfolio, including the Altura and Aorfix endovascular aneurysm repair systems, strengthening the company's position in the treatment of aortic disease. The acquired assets were integrated into MicroPort's endovascular business, which later became the separately listed subsidiary MicroPort Endovastec.

In January 2019, MicroPort announced a commitment to invest approximately $398 million in France over several years to expand research, development, and manufacturing of CRM devices including pacemakers and defibrillators at its Clamart facility. The announcement was made at the "Choose France" investment summit at the Palace of Versailles, part of the French government's initiative to attract foreign direct investment in advanced manufacturing and medical technology.

By the end of the decade, these acquisitions and investments had expanded MicroPort's operations from its original focus on coronary intervention into a diversified medical device company with business segments spanning orthopedics, cardiac rhythm management, and advanced endovascular therapies. The company's revenue composition reflected this diversification, with non-coronary segments representing a growing proportion of total revenue.

=== Listed subsidiaries and platform structure (2019–2022) ===
Beginning in 2019, MicroPort restructured its corporate organization around a platform strategy, establishing specialized subsidiaries focused on distinct therapeutic areas and technologies. This approach was designed to provide each business unit with dedicated management teams, separate capital structures, and the ability to pursue independent funding through public listings while maintaining strategic coordination under the MicroPort parent company.

In 2020, MicroPort Endovastec, the aortic and peripheral endovascular stent-graft business line, became one of the early medical device companies listed on the Shanghai Stock Exchange STAR Market (stock code: 688016.SH).

In 2021, MicroPort CardioFlow, which develops transcatheter aortic valve implantation (TAVI) systems such as VitaFlow and VitaFlow Liberty, was listed on the Main Board of the Hong Kong Stock Exchange (stock code 02160.HK). MicroPort MedBot, which develops the Toumai multi-port laparoscopic surgical robot and other robotic systems, was listed also listed in 2021 on the Hong Kong Stock Exchange (stock code 02252.HK).

In 2022, MicroPort NeuroTech, which focuses on neurovascular and neuromodulation devices, debuted on the Main Board of the Hong Kong Stock Exchange (stock code 02172.HK). Later that year in the electrophysiology segment, MicroPort EverPace, which develops cardiac ablation catheters, diagnostic catheters and 3D navigation systems, was listed on the Shanghai STAR Market (stock code 688351.SH).

=== Recent developments and globalization (2020s) ===
In the 2020s, MicroPort accelerated its international expansion strategy and advanced clinical research programs. In January 2022, the company established its regional subsidiary headquarters in California, incorporating manufacturing capabilities, an innovation center, and regulatory affairs operations to support commercialization efforts in the United States and broader global market.

Meanwhile, MicroPort MedBot expanded its international clinical program for the Toumai surgical robot system, with a focus on demonstrating remote surgery capabilities in a structured clinical evaluation program examining the technical feasibility and safety of remote robotic surgery in settings with limited access to specialized surgical expertise. In October 2024, the company reported completion of multiple telesurgery procedures in Angola, with surgeons operating the Toumai system remotely to perform urological and gynecological procedures on patients at healthcare facilities in Luanda. In June 2025, MicroPort MedBot conducted a radical prostatectomy procedure on a patient in Luanda, Angola, with urologist Vipul Patel operating the Toumai system remotely from AdventHealth Global Robotics Institute in Orlando, Florida. The procedure was the first intercontinental robotic telesurgery between the United States and Africa authorized under FDA regulatory oversight.

In October 2025, MicroPort announced that cumulative global shipments and implantations of its coronary stent systems had each surpassed 10 million units. This milestone encompassed all coronary stent platforms since the company's founding in 1998, including the Firebird, Firebird2, Firehawk, and Firesorb product families. According to the company, the achievement reflected growing adoption in international markets across Asia-Pacific, Latin America, and other regions.

MicroPort also announced several key changes to support globalization including a merger of MicroPort CardioFlow with the CRM business in a transaction valued at approximately US$680 million to create a more integrated global cardiovascular platform. It also announced changes to its senior management, including the introduction of a rotating co-chief executive officer role, to better support its globalization efforts.

As of 2025, MicroPort had expanded from its origins as a China-focused coronary intervention company into a diversified medical technology corporation with operations across multiple continents. Manufacturing and research facilities were established in China, the United States (California, Tennessee), France, and the United Kingdom, with products distributed in over 90 countries globally.

== Business operations ==
MicroPort operates through multiple business platforms spanning cardiovascular and structural heart intervention, cardiac rhythm management, electrophysiology, neurovascular and endovascular intervention, orthopedics, and surgical robotics, with several operating as separately listed subsidiaries.

=== Interventional cardiology ===
MicroPort’s interventional cardiology business encompasses coronary stents, bioresorbable vascular scaffolds, peripheral vascular devices, and associated delivery systems for percutaneous coronary intervention (PCI). The company’s coronary stent portfolio includes the Firebird, Firehawk, and Firesorb product families. Firehawk, described by the company as the world’s first “targeted” drug-eluting stent, delivers sirolimus from recessed abluminal grooves at a lower drug and polymer load compared with many contemporary drug-eluting stents, with the aim of reducing delayed vascular healing while maintaining anti-restenotic efficacy.

=== Structural heart and cardiac rhythm management ===
MicroPort’s structural heart and CRM platforms represent its implantable cardiovascular device businesses focused on valvular heart disease, pacing, and heart failure therapy. The structural heart business is operated through the listed subsidiary MicroPort CardioFlow (02160.HK), which develops transcatheter heart valve implantation systems for the treatment of aortic valve disease.

MicroPort’s CRM business is headquartered in Clamart, France, and was formed through the 2018 acquisition of LivaNova’s CRM division for approximately €190 million. The CRM portfolio includes pacemakers, implantable cardioverter-defibrillators (ICDs), cardiac resynchronization therapy (CRT) systems, and associated transvenous leads for the treatment of bradyarrhythmias, ventricular arrhythmias, and heart failure.

In 2025, MicroPort announced a merger of CardioFlow with its CRM business to form a more integrated global cardiovascular implantable device platform.

=== Orthopedics ===
MicroPort Orthopedics, based in Arlington, Tennessee, was established through the 2014 acquisition of Wright Medical's OrthoRecon business for $290 million. The product portfolio includes the ADVANCE Medial-Pivot knee system, PROFEMUR hip systems, DYNASTY and TRINITY hip replacement implants, and various trauma fixation devices.

=== Surgical robotics ===
MicroPort's surgical robotics business is operated through Shanghai MicroPort MedBot (02252.HK), a separately listed subsidiary that completed its initial public offering in November 2021. Its primary multi-port product is the Toumai Surgical Robot System, a four-arm laparoscopic robot designed for minimally invasive general, thoracic, urological, and gynecological surgery.

=== Other platforms ===
Additional business platforms include endovascular implants, neurologic devices, critical care and extracorporeal membrane oxygenation systems (ECMO), minimally invasive urological devices, metabolic and diabetes care technologies, and other specialty medical-device divisions operated through unlisted subsidiaries.
