= Microport =

Microport may refer to:

- MicroPort, a manufacturer of medical devices
- Microport Systems (1985–2002), a software developer of Unix ports
