= Drug-eluting stent =

Medical implant to treat narrowed arteries

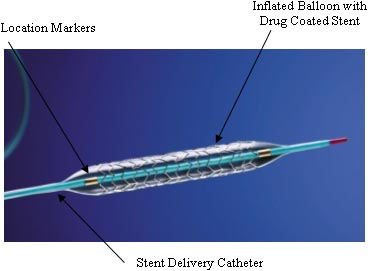
- An example of a drug-eluting stent: the TAXUS Express^{2} Paclitaxel-Eluting Coronary Stent System, which releases paclitaxel. The system consists of a catheter delivery element, an inflation system, and the drug-eluting stent itself. They are marketed as one integrated system.
- ICD-9-CM: 00.55
- MeSH: D054855

A drug-eluting stent (DES) is a medical implant consisting of a tube, made of a mesh-like material. It is used to treat atherosclerosis, the narrowing of arteries. It alleviates the symptom both mechanically (by providing a supporting scaffold inside the artery) and pharmacologically (by slowly releasing a pharmaceutical compound). A DES is inserted into a narrowed artery using a delivery catheter usually inserted through a larger artery in the groin or wrist. The stent assembly carries the DES mechanism towards the front of the catheter, and is usually composed of the collapsed stent over a collapsed polymeric balloon mechanism which is inflated to expand the stent once in position. The stent expands and embeds into the occluded artery wall, keeping the artery open, thereby improving blood flow. The mesh design allows for stent expansion and also for new healthy vessel endothelial cells to grow through and around it, securing it in place.

A DES differs from other types of stents in that it keeps a blood vessel open mechanically and also delivers a small amount of a drug directly into the blood vessel wall for a limited period of time. The drug is chemically attached to the wall of the stent. After the stent has been positioned and the clogged vessel reopened, the stent delivers a small amount of the drug into the blood vessel interior wall. This delivery allows time for stent embedding and reduces the chances of the stent interior becoming blocked. Only a small amount of tissue growth inhibiting drug is carried by the stent, just enough to allow time for blood vessel embedding and for it to function mechanically to keep a vessel open.

DESs are commonly used in the treatment of narrowed arteries in the heart (coronary artery disease (CAD)), but also elsewhere in the body, especially the legs (peripheral artery disease). Since coronary stenting became routine following US FDA approval in 1994, it has matured into a primary minimally invasive treatment tool in managing CAD. Coronary artery stenting is inherently tied to percutaneous coronary intervention (PCI) procedures. PCI is a minimally invasive procedure performed via a catheter (not by open-chest surgery), it is the medical procedure used to place a DES in narrowed coronary arteries. PCI procedures are performed by an interventional cardiologist using fluoroscopic imaging techniques to see the location of the required DES placement. PCI uses larger peripheral arteries in the arms or the legs to thread a DES catheter through the arterial system and place the stent in the narrowed coronary artery. Multiple stents may be used depending on the degree of blockage and the number of diseased coronary arteries that need treatment.

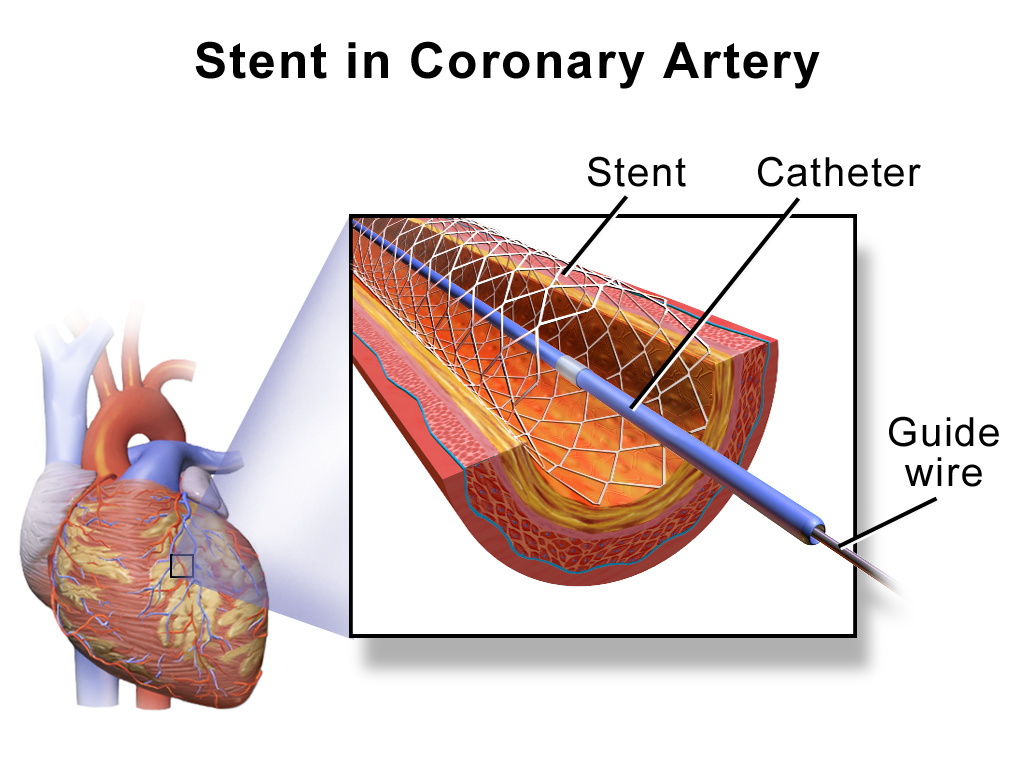
Stent placement in an artery using a percutaneous coronary intervention (PCI) minimally invasive technique

The first DES approved for clinical use was the sirolimus-eluting Cypher stent, which received CE marking in Europe in 2002 and US FDA approval in 2003. Paclitaxel-eluting stents followed in 2004. DES were developed to address the high rates of in-stent restenosis (20-40%) seen with earlier bare-metal stents (BMS); DES reduced this rate to approximately 5-10%. Current-generation DES use thinner struts made of cobalt-chromium or platinum-chromium alloys, biocompatible or biodegradable coatings, and limus family drugs such as everolimus and zotarolimus.

Risks of DES placement include stent thrombosis (approximately 0.7% at one year), bleeding, and allergic reactions to contrast agents. An alternative to PCI with DES is coronary artery bypass graft surgery, which may be preferred for patients with complex multi-vessel disease. The use of DES has been accompanied by debate over potential overuse in patients with stable coronary artery disease, where optimal medical therapy alone may provide comparable outcomes.

== Design ==
A drug-eluting stent (DES) is a small mesh tube that is placed in the arteries to keep them open in the treatment of vascular disease. The stent slowly releases a drug to block cell proliferation (a biological process of cell growth and division), thus preventing the arterial narrowing (stenosis) that can occur after stent implantation. While such stents can be used in stenotic arteries throughout the body, they are commonly placed in the coronary arteries to treat coronary heart disease. DES products are integrated medical devices and are part of a percutaneous coronary intervention (PCI) delivery system.

A drug-eluting stent is a medical device with several key properties: it is a structural scaffold that physically keeps an artery open to ensure blood flow; the device has specific drug delivery features, and the chosen drug is critical for its effectiveness. The drug, the hallmark component of the device, is selected for its suitability in inhibiting restenosis and its pharmacokinetics, and the materials used in the fabrication of the device are carefully chosen for their biocompatibility and durability in a biological environment; these materials must also withstand the constant motion of the heart's beat and be suitable for future patient imaging using magnetic resonance imaging (MRI) technologies, which employ high magnetic fields.

Other components, such as the catheter, also play significant roles in the device's overall functionality and effectiveness.

DES are typically composed of metal alloys, most commonly stainless steel or cobalt-chromium, but can also be made of other materials such as platinum-chromium or nickel-titanium. The stent may be coated with a polymer to regulate the rate of release of the drugs into the surrounding tissue. There are also polymer-free stents where the drug is directly coated on the stent or contained in reservoirs within the stent.

The design of the stent includes struts, which are thin wire structures that make up the stent frame. The strut thickness can influence the stent's performance, with thinner struts generally being associated with lower restenosis rates and reduced thrombosis risk.

Most DES are balloon-expandable, meaning they are mounted on a balloon catheter and expand when the balloon is inflated. There are also self-expanding stents, which automatically expand when deployed. The first stent, introduced in 1986, was of this type.

The stent tube mesh is initially collapsed onto the catheter—in this collapsed state, it is small enough to be passed through relatively narrow arteries and then expanded in its destination place, pushing firmly against the diseased artery wall.

The pharmaceutical compounds that these stents emit are antiproliferative agents such as sirolimus, everolimus, zotarolimus, paclitaxel and biolimus. These drugs help prevent the arterial narrowing that can occur after stent implantation. These drugs are also used for other purposes, that involve moderating the immune system or treating cancer. They work by inhibiting cell growth. In DES, they are used in small amounts and for a short time, and only in the area where the stent is placed.

There is a distinction between coronary stents and peripheral stents. While both are used to prevent the narrowing of arteries, coronary stents are specifically for the coronary arteries, while peripheral stents are for any other arteries in the body. Peripheral stents are mostly of the bare metal type; some peripheral DES, of the self-expanding type, are used in arteries of the legs.

Bioresorbable DES are made of materials that can be absorbed by the body over time, potentially reducing long-term complications associated with permanent stents.

== Uses ==
=== General background ===
Atherosclerosis is a chronic disease that affects the large and medium-sized arteries. The disease is characterized by the accumulation of calcium, fats (such as cholesterol) and other substances in the innermost layer of the endothelium, a layer of cells that line the interior surface of blood vessels. Atherosclerosis is considered to be the most common form of arteriosclerosis, which refers to the loss of arterial elasticity caused by thickening and stiffening of blood vessels.

Atherosclerosis can begin as early as childhood with the development of small "fatty streaks" within arteries. These streaks are essentially deposits of fat. Over time, these initial lesions grow larger and become thicker, forming atheromas (atherosclerotic plaques).

Drug-eluting stents (DESs) are used in the treatment of atherosclerosis in both coronary interventions and peripheral arterial interventions:

- In coronary interventions, DESs are used to treat coronary artery disease, which is primarily caused by atherosclerosis. The stents are inserted into narrowed coronary arteries and then expanded to open up the narrowed artery. The drug compound released by the stents suppresses cellular growth in the newly stented area, reducing the potential for blockage within the stent area itself.
- In peripheral arterial interventions, DESs are used to treat peripheral arterial disease (PAD), particularly peripheral arterial occlusive disease (PAOD) affecting the arteries of the legs.

=== Stenosis and restenosis ===
Stenosis refers to the narrowing of the blood vessels, which can restrict blood flow to the organs and tissues. This condition is often caused by the buildup of fatty deposits in the arteries, also called atherosclerosis. Stents are inserted into a narrowed artery during a procedure known as angioplasty. The stents help open up the narrowed artery and improve blood flow. However, over time, the treated artery can close up again, which is a condition known as restenosis.

Restenosis, or in-stent restenosis, is a blockage or narrowing that comes back in the portion of the artery previously treated with a stent. Restenosis tends to happen three to six months after the procedure. Restenosis is even more likely to occur if a stent was not used.

When restenosis occurs, another procedure may be needed to correct the problem, such as the placement of a DES that gradually releases a drug that suppresses cellular growth, thereby reducing the potential for blockage developing inside the stent. This therapy significantly reduces the occurrence of adverse events post-stenting.

=== Coronary interventions ===
In coronary interventions, DESs release medication over a period of approximately 30 to 45 days following implantation, inhibiting the formation of scar tissue within the stent and subsequent re-narrowing of the blood vessel. Multiple stents may be implanted depending on the extent of disease and the number of affected coronary arteries.

=== Peripheral arterial interventions ===
In peripheral arterial interventions, DESs have shown improved primary patency and reduced target lesion revascularization compared with bare-metal stents. Different types of DESs are available for peripheral use, each with different drug concentrations and varying efficacy.

=== Clinical indications ===
Coronary arteries providing blood to the heart. Narrowing of these vessels reduces blood supply to the cardiac muscle.

PCI and stent placement are considered when someone shows signs of reduced blood flow in the arteries that supply the heart or when tests, such as different types of coronary artery imaging, show a blockage in those arteries.

Symptoms can include:

- severe, pressure-like chest pain unrelieved by rest;
- shortness of breath, fatigue, lightheadedness;
- palpitations;
- atypical symptoms: nausea, vomiting, indigestion, confusion, back pain.

Because the presentation of ischemic chest pain varies considerably among individuals, clinical decisions regarding stent placement rely primarily on imaging findings rather than symptom descriptions alone.

== Contraindications ==
A drug-eluting stent is not recommended in some cases as it may do more harm than good. They are not suitable:

- when individuals have a bleeding tendency;
- when a coronary artery has no clear and identifiable narrowing;
- when only one diseased coronary artery supplies oxygenated blood to the heart muscle. During stent placement, there is a short period of blood flow blockage by the balloon inflation. This blockage time is often longer than twenty seconds to allow the DES to expand and embed into the arterial wall. In this case, this time may be too long and cause serious events due to lack of blood to the heart muscle.

Bleeding disorders make DES unsuitable because of the need for anticoagulation drugs (blood thinners) during the procedure and in post-stenting aftercare. Other factors that could rule out the use of stents include a history of in-stent blockage, bleeding problems, complex or unsuitable coronary anatomy, or a short life expectancy due to other serious medical conditions.

== Risks and complications ==
=== Surgical ===
Stent placement risks include bleeding, allergic reactions to the contrast agents used to visualize the coronary arteries, and myocardial infarction. With percutaneous coronary intervention (PCI), the requirement for emergency coronary artery bypass graft (CABG) surgery has decreased as better practices have been introduced. In some situations, coronary stenting is permitted in hospitals without cardiac surgery facilities, although expert consensus from the Society for Cardiovascular Angiography and Interventions (SCAI) has found PCI without on-site surgery to be comparably safe. Coronary artery perforation occurs in approximately 0.4% of PCI procedures; it can lead to cardiac tamponade (in about 21% of perforations), emergency surgery, and carries a mortality rate of approximately 7.5%.

=== Stent thrombosis ===
A complication of coronary stenting is stent thrombosis (blood clots). This occurs when a new clot forms within the stent and occludes blood flow, causing a heart attack. The incidence of stent thrombosis is approximately 0.7% at one year, with an annual rate of 0.2-0.6% thereafter; stent thrombosis carries a mortality rate of 20-45%.

=== In-stent restenosis ===
Drug-eluting stents were designed to specifically combat issues of restenosis that occurred with older bare-metal stents (BMS), which had angiographic restenosis rates of 20-40%. Though less frequent with drug-eluting stents, restenosis can still occur, with DES reducing the rate to approximately 5-10%.

Since the advent of DES technology, the incidence of ISR has decreased from 20-40% with BMS to below 10% with current-generation DES.

=== Usage outside the scope of typical regulatory approval ===
DES have been shown to be superior to BMS in reducing short-term complications of stenting in saphenous vein grafts. However, the use of DESs in bypass grafts was not their originally intended use nor within the scope of originally regulatory approval (US FDA, European Medicines Agency, etc.). The practice of using a medical device or drug in a way not specified in the original or current approved labeling is often referred to as "off-label" use.

Studies have estimated that approximately 50-60% of DES use has been off-label. The Lown Institute, a healthcare policy organization, has estimated that unnecessary coronary stents cost Medicare as much as $800 million per year.

== Clinical procedure ==
=== DES placement ===
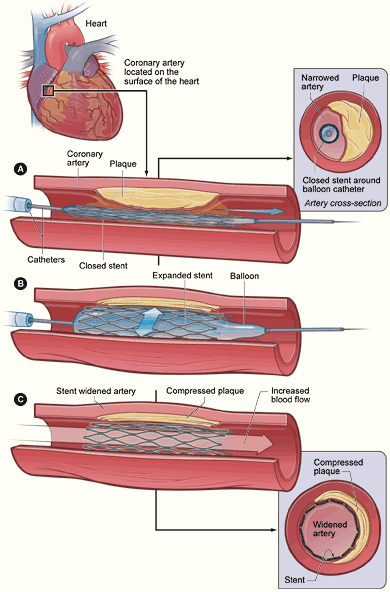
Diagram of stent placement. In A, the catheter is inserted across the lesion. In B, the balloon is inflated, expanding the stent and compressing the plaque. In C, the catheter and deflated balloon have been removed. Before-and-after cross-sections of the artery show the results of the stent placement.

People who receive a coronary stent have different needs depending on their medical condition. Some patients are actually having a heart attack and need immediate life-saving emergency care. Other patients are at high risk of having a heart attack in the near future. For people from each of these groups, PCI procedures may vary slightly, with particular modifications as to how they are sedated, pain management, and broader intensive care issues such as breathing support.

Many people who are not in critical care situations are usually fully awake during the PCI procedure and DES placement, but they receive local anesthetic at the site of catheter entry, to ensure there is no pain. Different sedation and pain management practices are used by different medical institutions and practitioners, but patient comfort is always a primary consideration.

The catheter/stent system is inserted into the body by piercing a peripheral artery (an artery in the arm or leg) and moved through the arterial system to deliver the DES into the blocked coronary artery. The stent is then expanded to widen (open) blocked or narrowed coronary arteries (narrowed by plaque buildup), caused by a condition called atherosclerosis. Peripheral arterial access is usually through the femoral (upper leg) or the radial artery (arm/wrist) and less often done through the brachial or ulnar artery (wrist/arm). In the past, controlling bleeding at the point of arterial access after the procedure was a problem. Arterial pressure bands and arterial closure systems have helped control bleeding after the procedure, but it remains a concern.

Current-generation catheter/stent systems are integrated medical devices, made of a guidewire, catheter, balloon, and stent. The stent tube mesh is initially collapsed onto the balloon of the device, and it is small enough to be passed through relatively narrow peripheral arteries. When in position, the balloon is inflated by introducing physiological saline, and this pushes the overlaying stent firmly into the diseased artery wall, the duration of balloon inflation and inflation pressure are recorded during this placement procedure. After placement, the balloon is deflated, and the insertion device is removed from the body, leaving the expanded stent in place and supporting the expanded artery.

The interventional cardiologist decides how to treat the blockage in the best way during the PCI/DES placement, based on real-time data. The cardiologist uses imaging data provided by both intravascular ultrasound (IVUS), and fluoroscopic imaging (combined with a radiopaque dye). During the procedure, the information obtained from these two sources enables the cardiologist to track the path of the catheter-DES device as it moves through the arterial blood vessels. This information also helps determine both the location and characteristics of any plaque causing narrowing in the arteries. Data from these two techniques is used to correctly position the stent and to obtain detailed information relating to the coronary arterial anatomy. Given that this anatomy varies greatly among individuals, having this information becomes a prerequisite for effective treatment. The obtained data is recorded on video and may be used in cases when further treatment is needed.

=== Recovery and rehabilitation ===
For many people the stenting procedure does not require staying in the hospital for any extended period, most people leave the hospital the same day. Much of the time immediately after the stenting is spent in a recovery area to make sure the access site is not bleeding and to ensure vital signs are stable.

In most hospital settings, the interventional cardiologist who performed the procedure will speak directly with the patient/family about how things went, and follow-up instructions. The nursing staff will monitor the person's condition with instruments like ECG to monitor their heart. To prevent a blood clot from forming in the stent, medications are given right after the procedure. One common medication is plavix, which is a potent blood thinner in pill form. Other medicines that thin the blood are also used, and it is typical to combine aspirin with plavix. For people who have had a heart attack, the length of hospitalization is dependent on the degree of heart muscle damage caused by the event.

An implanted DES is a medical device, so people who receive it are given a medical device card. This card has information on the implanted DES and a medical device serial number. This card is important for future medical procedures, because it informs doctors of what type of device is in the person's body. Some arterial closure systems, which are devices that help to seal the access site after the procedure, are also classed as medical devices and have their own informational cards.

The access site is the place where the catheter enters the artery in the arm or leg. There is usually soreness and bruising at this site, which usually recovers in about a week. People are advised to rest for a week or two and not to lift heavy things. This rest is mainly to make sure the access site heals well. Follow-up appointments with a cardiologist or a primary care provider/general practitioner within a week or two of the procedure are normal.

People who get a coronary stent usually have check-ups every three to six months for the first year, but this can vary. They usually do not need to have another coronary angiography, which is a test that uses a special dye and X-rays to see the arteries of the heart. If the doctors suspect that the heart disease is getting worse, they can prescribe a stress test, to measure how the heart performs during physical activity. People who have symptoms or show signs of reduced blood flow to the heart in a stress test may need a diagnostic cardiac re-catheterization.

After PCI-stenting procedures, physical examinations are necessary. People with a high risk of complications or more complex coronary problems may need angiography even if the results of non-invasive stress tests appear normal.

Cardiac rehabilitation activities depend on many factors, but mainly on how much the heart muscle was damaged before the PCI/DES procedure. Many people who have this procedure have not had a heart attack, and their hearts may be fine. Others may have had a heart attack and their hearts may have trouble pumping oxygen-rich blood to the body. Rehabilitation activities are tailored to each person's needs.

== Efficacy ==
=== Benefits ===
Drug-eluting stents are an improvement over older bare-metal stents as they reduce the chances of in-stent blockages. A systematic review and meta-analysis of randomized clinical trials found that DES significantly reduced target-vessel revascularization compared to BMS, without increasing the risk of death or myocardial infarction.

The major benefit of DESs when compared to BMSs is the prevention of in-stent restenosis (ISR). Restenosis is a gradual re-narrowing of the stented segment that occurs most commonly between 3–12 months after stent placement. High rates of restenosis associated with BMS (20-40% in clinical trials) prompted the development of DES, which reduced ISR incidence to around 5-10%. Continued development of newer generation DES have resulted in the near-elimination of BMS from clinical practice.

=== Procedure outcomes ===
A key benefit of DES usage compared to BMS is a lower incidence of repeat revascularization procedures (re-stenting, invasive bypass surgeries etc.). Revascularization procedures are treatments that restore blood flow to parts of the heart that are not getting enough blood, a problem called ischemia.

Ischemia can happen because of plaque buildup in the arteries of the heart, which can narrow or block them. Drug-eluting stents reduce the risk of restenosis primarily by releasing anti-proliferative medications—such as sirolimus or paclitaxel—that inhibit neointimal hyperplasia, the excessive tissue growth inside the artery that can lead to re-narrowing. As a result, rates of repeat revascularizations and stent thrombosis (blood clots) are significantly lower in those who received DES compared to BMS.

Newer generations of DES devices have substantially improved safety outcomes, specifically regarding stent thrombosis, recurrent myocardial infarctions, and death. These improvements stem from advancements in stent design, including thinner struts, more biocompatible polymers, and enhanced drug-release kinetics. Such features promote better endothelial healing while maintaining anti-restenotic effects.

== Considerations for regulatory submission, assessment and approval ==
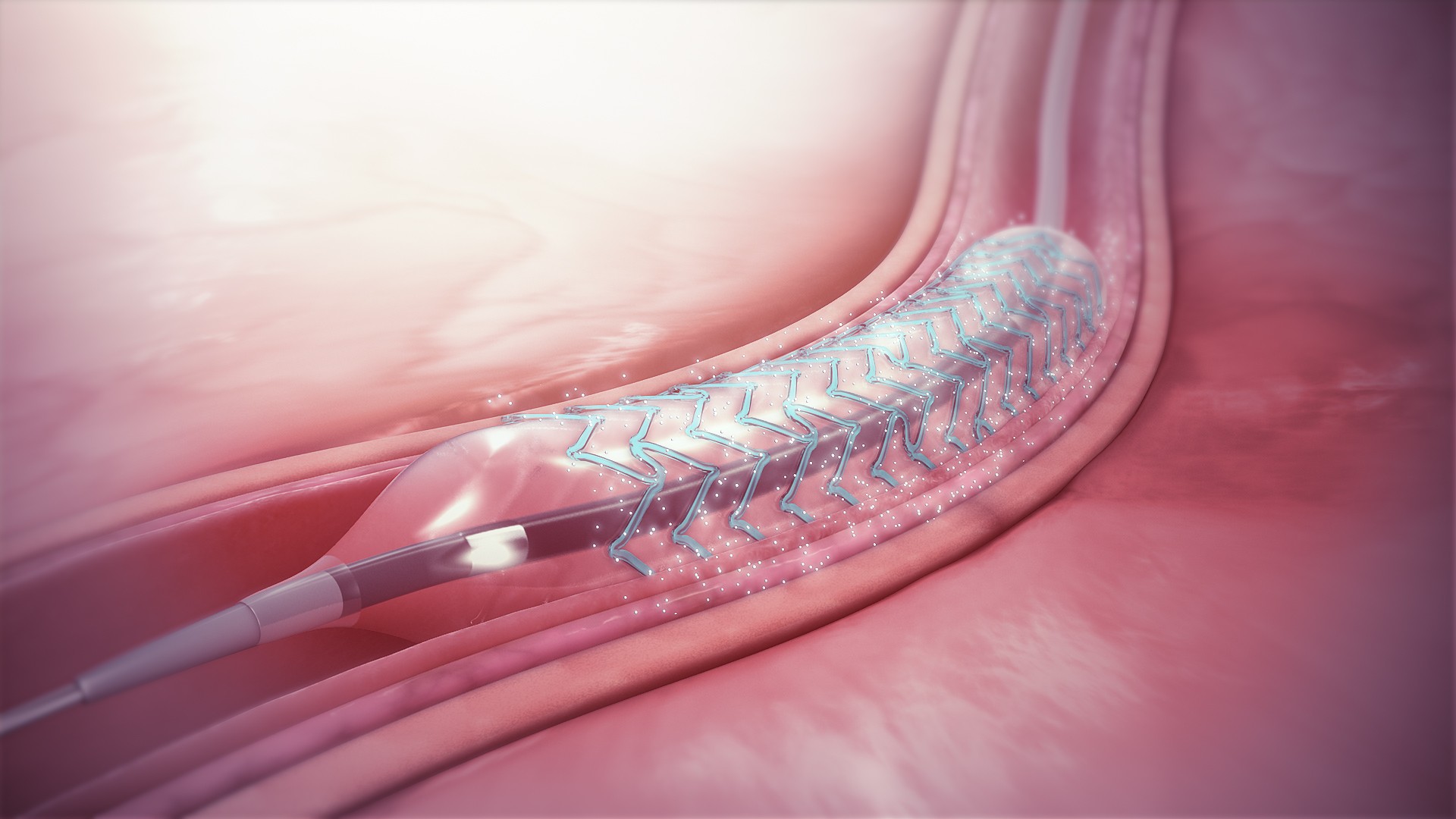
Graphic representation of a drug-eluting stent expanded into artery. The lower section is referred to as a catheter. The DES and catheter are usually one integrated medical system. The white particles represent the drug eluting into the arterial walls - inhibiting the growth of tissue into the stented area.

There are a number of very detailed medical device design considerations for DES products, these considerations are included in submissions for approval to regulatory authorities such as the US FDA:

- Aspects of the design that relate to a DES as structural devices that keep an artery open by purely physical means.
- Choice of the construction materials, with a particular focus on biocompatibility, longevity in the human body, mechanical stress resistance and the suitability of the chosen material for future patient imaging using MRI technologies, due to the high magnetic fields used in such imaging.
- Choice of a mechanism of the drug release: how long the drug lasts, and how to make the stent release the drug in a manner that inhibits in-stent restenosis.
- Choice of chemical agent the stent will deliver.
- Choice of the stent delivery technology as an integrated system: catheter design, placement visualization and assessment of the success of artery reperfusion (is the treated artery actually supplying cardiac muscle with sufficient oxygenated blood).
- Quality assurance considerations such as those defined in ISO 13485.
- Quality control considerations: what testing can be performed on each manufactured unit prior to release for sale to demonstrate its usage suitability.
- Traceability issues, can a single stent be traced from the manufacturer to the patient it was implanted in. In the case of a recall of a product it is critical to be able to trace the stent from design, manufacture, and distribution to the patient.

The drug choice is a critical design element and determining its true effectiveness in inhibiting neointimal growth due to the proliferation of smooth muscle cells that would cause restenosis can be a design challenge. Much of the neointimal hyperplasia seems to be caused by inflammation.

Vascular stents are classified by the US as class III medical devices, meaning that they pose the highest risk to patients and are subject to both general and premarket approval, which requires clinical trials and scientific evidence of safety and effectiveness, as well as rigorous mechanical testing. During the mechanical testing process, universal testing machines induce bending, stretching, twisting, and putting pressure on vascular stents from various angles.

The specific properties of each type of stent and its intended use depend on the results of testing, and vice versa: different types of stents may need different or additional tests based on where they will be placed in the body and what they will be used for. Some of these additional tests might include checking how well the stent can withstand being crushed or bent out of shape, its resistance to getting kinks in it, whether it resists corrosion or damage over time, as well as making sure any coatings on the device remain intact.

== Alternatives ==
Pharmacological therapy for coronary artery disease may be indicated instead of or in addition to invasive treatment. For those requiring percutaneous coronary intervention or surgery, medical therapy should be viewed as complementary to revascularization procedures, rather than an opposing strategy. Coronary artery bypass graft (CABG) surgery is an alternative to percutaneous coronary intervention (PCI) with drug-eluting stents (DES) for patients with ischemic left ventricular systolic dysfunction (LVSD). CABG is associated with lower risks of all-cause mortality, repeat revascularization, and myocardial infarction compared to PCI.

== History ==
The first procedure to treat coronary occlusion was a coronary artery bypass graft (CABG), which uses a section of another vein or artery to bypass the obstructed segment of coronary artery. In 1977, Andreas Grüntzig introduced percutaneous transluminal coronary angioplasty (PTCA), also called balloon angioplasty, expanding a balloon catheter, guided through a peripheral artery, to force expansion of the narrowed segment.

As equipment and techniques improved, the use of PTCA rapidly increased, and by the mid-1980s, PTCA and CABG were being performed at equivalent rates. Balloon angioplasty was generally effective and safe, but restenosis was frequent, occurring in about 30–40% of cases, usually within the first year. In about 3% of balloon angioplasty cases, failure of the dilation and acute or threatened closure of the coronary artery (often because of dissection) prompted emergency CABGs.

Charles Theodore Dotter and Melvin Judkins had proposed using prosthetic devices inside leg arteries to maintain blood flow after dilation as early as 1964. In 1986, Puel and Sigwart implanted the first coronary stent in a human patient. Several trials in the 1990s showed the superiority of stent placement over balloon angioplasty. Restenosis was reduced because the stent acted as a scaffold to hold open the dilated segment of the artery. Acute closure of the coronary artery (and the requirement for emergency CABG) was reduced, because the stent repaired dissections of the arterial wall. By 1999, stents were used in 84% of percutaneous coronary interventions (i.e., those done via a catheter, and not by open-chest surgery).

Early difficulties with coronary stents included a risk of early thrombosis (clotting) resulting in occlusion of the stent. Coating stainless steel stents with other substances such as platinum or gold did not eliminate this problem. High-pressure balloon expansion of the stent to ensure it lies in full contact with the arterial wall, combined with drug therapy using aspirin and another inhibitor of platelet aggregation (usually ticlopidine or clopidogrel) nearly eliminated this risk of early stent thrombosis.

Though it occurred less frequently than with balloon angioplasty or other techniques, stents nonetheless remained vulnerable to restenosis, caused almost exclusively by neointimal tissue growth (tissue formation in the inner 'tube' structure of the artery). To address this issue, developers of drug-eluting stents used the devices themselves as a tool for delivering medication directly to the arterial wall. While initial efforts were unsuccessful, the release (elution) of drugs from the stent was shown in 2001 to achieve high concentrations of the drug locally, directly at the target lesion, with minimal systemic side effects. As currently used in clinical practice, "drug-eluting" stents refers to metal stents that elute a drug designed to limit the growth of neointimal scar tissue, thus reducing the likelihood of stent restenosis.

The first type of DES to be approved by the European Medicines Agency (EMA) and the US Food and Drug Administration (FDA) were sirolimus-eluting stents (SES), releasing sirolimus, a natural immunosuppressant drug. SES were shown to reduce the need for repeat procedures and improve the outcomes of patients with coronary artery disease. The sirolimus-eluting Cypher stent received CE mark approval in Europe in 2002, and then underwent a larger trial to demonstrate its safety and effectiveness for the US market. The trial, published in 2003, enrolled 1058 patients with more complex lesions and confirmed the superiority of SES over bare metal stents in terms of angiographic and clinical outcomes. Based on these results, the Cypher stent received FDA approval and was released in the US in 2003. The FDA approval process for DES involves submitting an investigational device exemption (IDE) application to conduct clinical trials under 21 CFR Part 812, and then a premarket approval (PMA) application to obtain marketing authorization under 21 CFR Part 8144. The FDA assigns the primary review responsibility to the Center for Devices and Radiological Health (CDRH), but also consults with the Center for Drug Evaluation and Research (CDER) for the drug component of the combination product.

The second type of DES to be approved by the EMA and the FDA were paclitaxel-eluting stents (PES), which release another natural product called paclitaxel. PES also reduced the need for repeat procedures and improved the outcomes of patients with different types of lesions and risk factors. The paclitaxel-eluting Taxus stent received FDA approval and was launched in the US in 2004, after a series of trials that compared it with a bare metal stent in various settings. The trials showed a significant reduction in target lesion revascularization and major adverse cardiac events with the Taxus stent at 9 and 12 months. Both SES and PES use natural products as the active agents to prevent the recurrence of blockages in the arteries. These DES have changed the practice of interventional cardiology and have become the preferred treatment for many patients with coronary artery disease.

The initial rapid acceptance of DES led to their peak usage in 2005, accounting for 90% of all stent implantations, but concerns about late stent thrombosis led to a decrease in DES usage in late 2006. Subsequent studies reassured the medical community about their safety, showing that while DES may have a slightly higher risk for very late stent thrombosis, they significantly reduce target vessel revascularization without increasing the incidence of death or myocardial infarction; these reassurances led to a resurgence in DES utilization, although it did not reach the peak usage rates seen in early 2006.

The concept of using absorbable (also called biodegradable, bioabsorbable or bioresorbable) materials in stents was first reported in 1878 by Huse who used magnesium wires as ligatures to halt the bleeding in vessels of three patients. Despite extensive search, the full name of this pioneer in the field remains elusive. In 20th century, a resorbable stent tested in humans was developed by the Igaki Medical Planning Company in Japan and was constructed from poly-L-lactic acid (a form of polylactic acid); they published their initial results in 2000. The German company Biotronik developed a magnesium absorbable (bioresorbable) stent and published clinical results in 2007.

The first company to bring a bioresorbable stent to market was Abbott Vascular which received European marketing approval in September 2012; the second was Elixir which received its CE mark in May 2013.

The first-generation bioresorbable stents, such as the Absorb bioresorbable stent by Abbott, performed poorly. In comparison to current-generation drug-eluting stents, numerous trials revealed that these first-generation bioresorbable stents exhibited poor outcomes. Specifically, they showed high rates of stent thrombosis (cases where an implanted coronary stent caused a thrombotic occlusion), target-lesion myocardial infarction (heart attack occurring at the site of the treated lesion), and target vessel revascularization (the need for further procedures to restore blood flow in the treated artery). In 2017, Abbott pulled its bioabsorbable stent, Absorb, from the European market after negative press regarding the device. Boston Scientific also announced termination of its Renuvia bioresorbable coronary stent program as studies showed higher risk of serious adverse events.

Fully bioresorbable stents are currently little used in coronary interventions. Various manufacturers continue to develop new bioresorbable stents, but their clinical impact is not yet established.

Due to challenges in developing resorbable stents, many manufacturers have focused efforts on targeting or reducing drug release through bioabsorbable-polymer coatings. Boston Scientific's Synergy bioabsorbable polymer stent has been shown potential to reduce the length of dual antiplatelet therapy post-implantation. MicroPort's Firehawk target eluting stent has been shown to be non-inferior to traditional drug-eluting stents while using one-third of the amount of equivalent drug.

As for the materials used to make a DES, the first DES products available for treating patients were stainless steel alloys composed of iron, nickel, and chromium and were based on existing bare metal stents. These stents were hard to visualize with medical imaging, posed a risk of causing allergic responses, and were difficult to deliver. Subsequent new alloys were used, namely cobalt-chrome and platinum chrome, with improved performance. Bioresorbable stents have been developed in which the stent itself dissolves over time. Materials explored for use include magnesium, polylactic acid, polycarbonate polymers, and salicylic acid polymers. Resorbable stents have held the promise of providing an acute treatment that would eventually allow the vessel to function normally, without leaving a permanent device behind.

For the coating of DES, one to three or more layers of polymer can be used: a base layer for adhesion, a main layer that holds and elutes (releases) the drug into the arterial wall by contact transfer, and sometimes a top coat to slow down the release of the drug and extend its effect. The first few drug-eluting stents to be licensed used durable coatings. The first generation of coatings appears to have caused immunological reactions at times, and some possibly led to thrombosis. These problems have driven experimentation and the development of new coating approaches.

== Research directions ==
A research direction for a DES is to improve the material from which a device is made. The first-generation DES were made of stainless steel, while contemporary DES mainly consist of different kinds of alloys such as cobalt chromium and platinum chromium. In the current generation DES, thinner struts are employed than in the first-generation DES with preserved radial strength and radio-opacity. The lower strut thickness is believed to be associated with better stent-related outcomes including target lesion revascularization, myocardial infarction, and stent thrombosis.

Another area of research for DES focuses on polymers. The current generation DES includes both durable polymer-coated stents and biodegradable polymer-coated stents. The presence of a durable polymer in the body over a long period has been reported to lead to chronic inflammation and neoatherosclerosis. To address this potential limitation, researchers have developed biodegradable polymer DES as an alternative solution.

Scientists are also studying different drugs that could be used in DES to prevent restenosis. These drugs, which have immunosuppressive and anti-cancer properties, aim to inhibit the growth of smooth muscle cells. Additionally, there is a specific type of stent that features an extra layer of anti-CD4 antibodies on its struts. This additional layer is positioned on top of the polymer coating and aims to capture circulating endothelial progenitor cells. The goal behind this design is to promote improved healing of the blood vessel lining, known as the endothelium.

A potential research focus for DES is the application of a polymer-free DES in clinical practice: moving away from polymer-based DES and instead using either a polymer-free DES or a drug-coated coronary stent. In the case of the polymer-free DES, it utilizes an abluminal coating of probucol to control the release of sirolimus. On the other hand, the drug-coated coronary stent has a micro-structured abluminal surface that allows for direct application of an anti-restenotic drug.

== Society and culture ==
=== Brand names and manufacturers ===
As of 2023 there are over 20 different types of drug-eluting stents available, with differences in features and characteristics.

=== Economics ===
The economic evaluation of DES has been a topic of extensive research. In 2007, the overall incremental cost-effectiveness ratio in Europe was €98,827 per quality-adjusted life-years gained. Avoiding one revascularization with DES would cost €4,794, when revascularization with BMS costs €3,2606.

=== Controversies ===
There were controversies related to the use of DES. In 2012, a meta-analysis of clinical trial data showed no benefit of the use of DES for people with stable coronary artery compared to treatment with drugs, yet, The New York Times interviewed David Brown, an author of the analysis, who said that more than half of patients with stable coronary artery disease were implanted with stents without even trying drug treatment and that he believed this happened because hospitals and doctors wanted to make more money.

The interview sparked a debate among cardiologists, researchers, and patients about the appropriateness and effectiveness of DES for stable coronary artery disease: some agreed with the study's findings and questioned the overuse of stents, while others criticized the study's methods and limitations and defended the benefits of stents, arguing that the interviewee's statement was "outrageous and defamatory" and that he was "insulting the integrity of the entire profession.

In 2013 the Times of India reported that DES were widely overused and that Indian distributors used profits from high markups on DES to bribe doctors to use them.

In 2014 an investigation by the Maharashtra Food and Drug Administration found that high markups and bribery related to DES was still widespread.

More recent research and clinical guidelines have clarified the role of DES in stable coronary artery disease. While large trials and meta-analyses have confirmed that DES do not reduce mortality or myocardial infarction risk in stable patients compared to optimal medical therapy, they can provide significant relief for patients who continue to experience angina despite pharmacologic treatment. As a result, current guidelines emphasize individualized assessment, shared decision-making, and reserving PCI with DES for patients whose symptoms are not adequately controlled with medications.

=== Intellectual property disputes ===
There have been several patent disputes related to drug-eluting stents. In one of them, Boston Scientific Corporation (BSC) has been found guilty of infringing upon a patent awarded to the University of Texas at Arlington in 2003 and licensed to TissueGen. This patent involves technology developed by TissueGen founder Kevin Nelson, during his time as a faculty member at the university. The technology is designed to deliver drugs through an extruded fiber within an implanted vascular stent. As a result, BSC has been ordered to pay $42 million in lost royalties to both TissueGen and the university

=== Class action lawsuits ===
Drug-eluting stents have been associated with legal and ethical controversies, and there have been related class action lawsuits. In 2014, the former owners of St. Joseph Medical Center in Maryland settled a class action lawsuit for $37 million with hundreds of patients who received unnecessary DES implantation. The lawsuit alleged that Dr. Mark Midei, a cardiologist at the center, falsified the degree of coronary artery stenosis to justify the use of DES, exposing the patients to increased risks of thrombosis, bleeding, and infection. Another DES manufacturer, Cordis Corporation, a subsidiary of Johnson & Johnson, was involved in lawsuits from people who suffered adverse events from the Cypher Stent, a stainless-steel DES coated with sirolimus, an immunosuppressant drug. The Cypher Stent was approved by the FDA in 2003, but soon after, the FDA issued a Safety Warning following 290 reports of subacute thrombosis and at least 60 deaths related to the device.

== See also ==
- bioresorbable stent – medical stent that dissolves or is absorbed by the body;
- coronary stent – medical stent implanted into coronary arteries;
- drug-eluting implant – implant for delivering a drug.
