= Angioplasty =

Procedure to widen narrow arteries or veins

- Balloon angioplasty
- Specialty: Interventional cardiology, interventional radiology, vascular surgery
- ICD-9-CM: 00.6, 36.0 39.50
- MeSH: D017130
- LOINC: 36760-7

Angioplasty, also known as balloon angioplasty and percutaneous transluminal angioplasty, is a minimally invasive endovascular procedure used to widen narrowed or obstructed arteries or veins, typically to treat arterial atherosclerosis.

A deflated balloon attached to a catheter (a balloon catheter) is passed over a guide-wire into the narrowed vessel and then inflated to a fixed size. The balloon forces expansion of the blood vessel and the surrounding muscular wall, allowing an improved blood flow. A stent may be inserted at the time of ballooning to ensure the vessel remains open, and the balloon is then deflated and withdrawn. Angioplasty has come to include all manner of vascular interventions that are typically performed percutaneously.

== Uses and indications ==
=== Coronary angioplasty ===
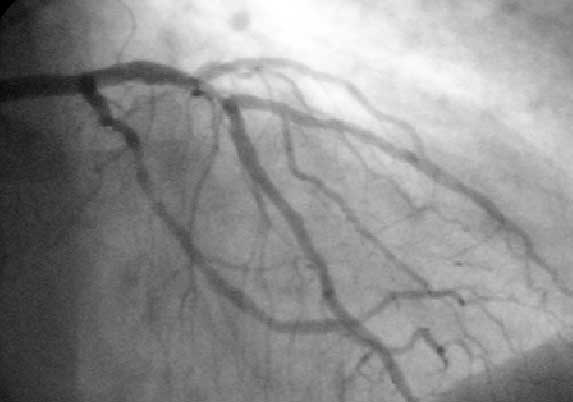
A coronary angiogram (an X-ray with radio-opaque contrast in the coronary arteries) that shows the left coronary circulation. The distal left main coronary artery (LMCA) is in the left upper quadrant of the image. Its main branches (also visible) are the left circumflex artery (LCX), which courses top to bottom initially and then toward the centre-bottom, and the left anterior descending (LAD) artery, which courses from left to right on the image and then down the middle of the image to project underneath the distal LCX. The LAD, as is usual, has two large diagonal branches, which arise at the centre-top of the image and course toward the centre-right of the image.

A coronary angioplasty is a therapeutic procedure used to treat stenotic (narrowed) coronary arteries of the heart in coronary heart disease. These stenotic segments arise due to the buildup of cholesterol-laden plaques that form in a condition known as atherosclerosis. A percutaneous coronary intervention, or coronary angioplasty with stenting, is a non-surgical procedure used to improve blood flow to the heart.

Coronary angioplasty is indicated for coronary artery diseases such as unstable angina, NSTEMI, STEMI, and spontaneous coronary artery perforation. Percutaneous coronary intervention for stable coronary disease has been shown to relieve symptoms such as angina, or chest pain, thereby improving functional limitations and quality of life.

=== Peripheral angioplasty ===
Peripheral angioplasty refers to the use of a balloon to open a blood vessel outside the coronary arteries. It is most commonly done to treat atherosclerotic narrowings of the abdomen, leg and renal arteries caused by peripheral artery disease. Often, peripheral angioplasty is used in conjunction with guide wire, peripheral stenting and an atherectomy.

=== Chronic limb-threatening ischemia ===
Angioplasty can be used to treat advanced peripheral artery disease to relieve the claudication, or leg pain, that is classically associated with the condition.

The bypass versus angioplasty in a study of severe ischemia of the leg investigated infrainguinal bypass surgery first compared to angioplasty first in select patients with severe lower limb ischemia who were candidates for either procedure. In this study, angioplasty was associated with less short term morbidity compared with bypass surgery; however, long term outcomes favor bypass surgery.

Based on this study, the ACCF/AHA guidelines recommend balloon angioplasty only for patients with a life expectancy of 2 years or less or those who do not have an autogenous vein available. For patients with a life expectancy greater than 2 of years life, or who have an autogenous vein, a bypass surgery could be performed first.

=== Renal artery angioplasty ===
Renal artery stenosis is associated with hypertension and loss of renal function. Atherosclerotic obstruction of the renal artery can be treated with angioplasty with or without stenting of the renal artery. There is a weak recommendation for renal artery angioplasty in patients with renal artery stenosis and flash edema or congestive heart failure.

=== Carotid angioplasty ===
Carotid artery stenosis can be treated with angioplasty and carotid stenting for patients at high risk for undergoing carotid endarterectomy. Although carotid endarterectomy is typically preferred over carotid artery stenting, stenting is indicated in select patients with radiation-induced stenosis or a carotid lesion not suitable for surgery.

=== Venous angioplasty ===
Angioplasty is used to treat venous stenosis affecting dialysis access, with drug-coated balloon angioplasty proving to have better 6 month and 12 month patency than conventional balloon angioplasty. Angioplasty is occasionally used to treat residual subclavian vein stenosis following decompression surgery for thoracic outlet syndrome. There is a weak recommendation for deep venous stenting to treat obstructive chronic venous disease.

== Contraindications ==
Angioplasty requires an access vessel, typically the femoral or radial artery or femoral vein, to permit access to the vascular system for the wires and catheters used. If no access vessel of sufficient size and quality is available, angioplasty is contraindicated. A small vessel diameter, the presence of posterior calcification, occlusion, hematoma, or an earlier placement of a bypass origin, may make access to the vascular system too difficult.

Percutaneous transluminal coronary angioplasty is contraindicated in patients with left main coronary artery disease, due to the risk of spasm of the left main coronary artery during the procedure. It is also not recommended if there is less than 70% stenosis of the coronary arteries, as stenosis is not hemodynamically significant below this level.

== Technique ==
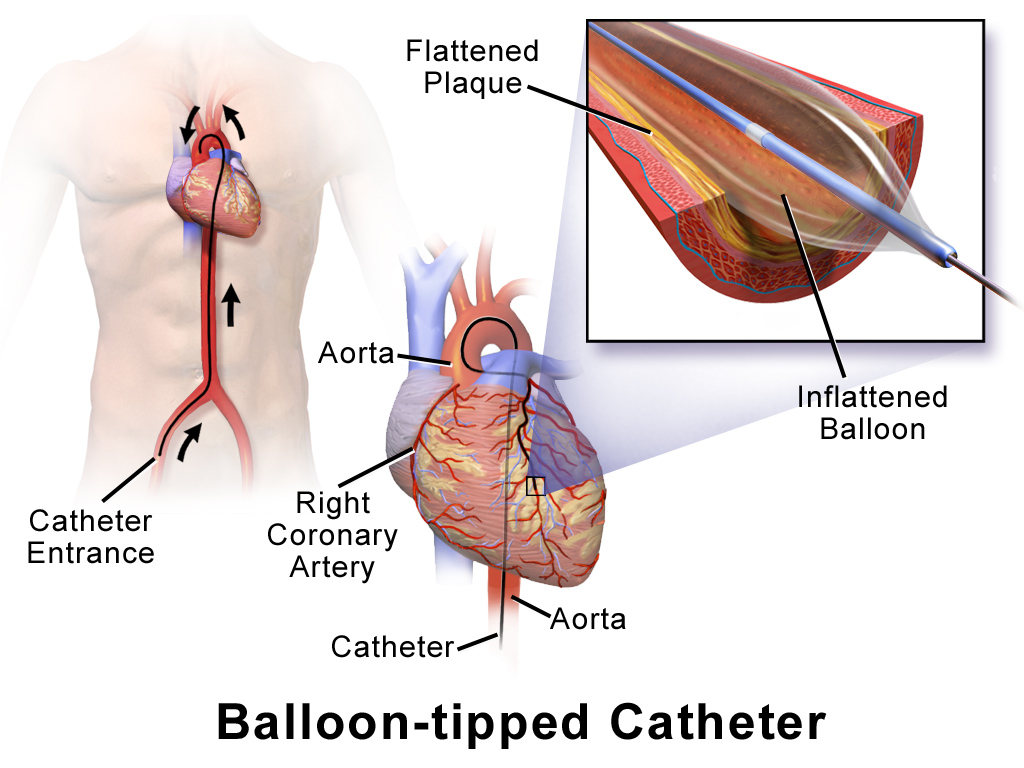
Balloon-tipped catheter.

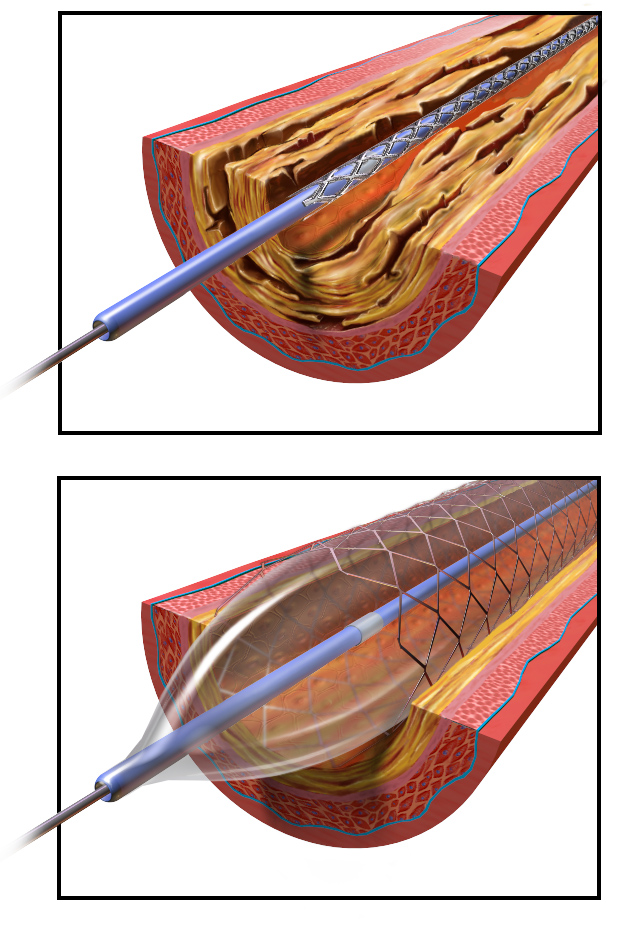
Balloon inflated with stent

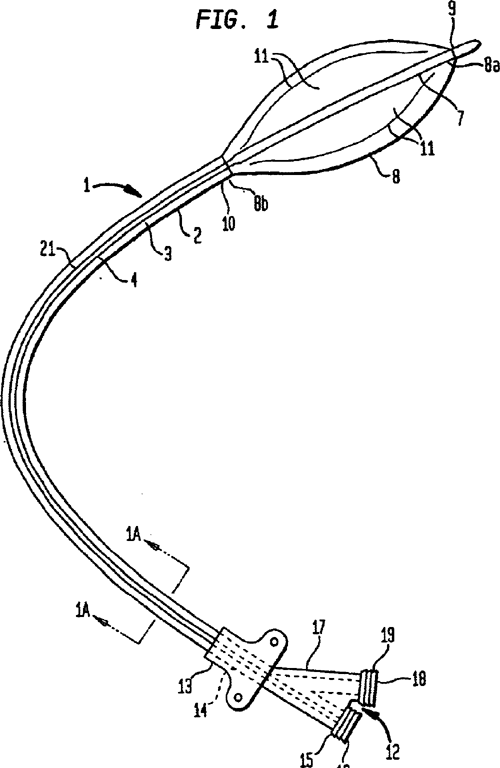
Diagram of a balloon catheter

Access to the vascular system is typically gained percutaneously (through the skin, without a large surgical incision). An introducer sheath is inserted into the blood vessel via the Seldinger technique. Fluoroscopic guidance uses magnetic resonance or X-ray fluoroscopy and radiopaque contrast dye to guide angled wires and catheters to the region of the body to be treated in real time. Tapered guidewire is chosen for small occlusion, followed by intermediate type guidewires for tortuous arteries and difficulty passing through extremely narrow channels, and stiff wires for hard, dense, and blunt occlusions.

To treat a narrowing in a blood vessel, a wire is passed through the stenosis in the vessel and a balloon on a catheter is passed over the wire (= OTW) and into the desired position. The positioning is verified by fluoroscopy and the balloon is inflated using water mixed with contrast dye to 75 to 500 times normal blood pressure (6 to 20 atmospheres), with most coronary angioplasties requiring less than 10 atmospheres. A stent may or may not also be placed.

At the conclusion of the procedure, the balloons, wires and catheters are removed and the vessel puncture site is treated either with direct pressure or a vascular closure device.

Transradial artery access and transfemoral artery access are two techniques for percutaneous coronary intervention. Transradial artery access is the technique of choice for management of acute coronary syndrome as it has significantly lower incidence of bleeding and vascular complications compared with the transfemoral artery approach. It also has a mortality benefit for high risk patients with acute coronary syndrome and who are at high risk of bleeding. Transradial artery access was also found to yield improved quality of life, as well as decreased healthcare costs and resources.

== Risks and complications ==
Relative to surgery, angioplasty is a lower-risk option for the treatment of the conditions for which it is used, but there are unique and potentially dangerous risks and complications associated with angioplasty:

- Embolization, or the launching of debris into the bloodstream
- Bleeding from over-inflation of a balloon catheter or the use of an inappropriately large or stiff balloon, or the presence of a calcified target vessel.
- Hematoma or pseudoaneurysm formation at the access site
- Radiation-induced injuries (burns) from the X-rays used
- Contrast-induced renal injury
- Cerebral hyperperfusion syndrome leading to stroke is a serious complication of carotid artery angioplasty with stenting.

Angioplasty may also provide a less durable treatment for atherosclerosis and be more prone to restenosis relative to vascular bypass or coronary artery bypass grafting. Drug-eluting balloon angioplasty has significantly less restenosis, late lumen loss and target lesion revascularization at both short term and midterm follow-up compared to uncoated balloon angioplasty for femoropopliteal arterial occlusive disease. Although angioplasty of the femoropopliteal artery with paclitaxel coated stents and balloons significantly reduces rates of vessel restenosis and target lesion revascularization, it was also found to have increased risk of death.

== Recovery ==
After angioplasty, most patients are monitored overnight in the hospital, but if there are no complications, patients are sent home the following day.

The catheter site is checked for bleeding and swelling and the heart rate and blood pressure are monitored to detect late rupture and hemorrhage. Post-procedure protocol also involves monitoring urinary output, cardiac symptoms, pain and other signs of systemic problems. Usually, patients receive medication that will relax them to protect the arteries against spasms. Patients are typically able to walk within two to six hours following the procedure and return to their normal routine by the following week.

Angioplasty recovery consists of avoiding physical activity for several days after the procedure. Patients are advised to avoid heavy lifting and strenuous activities for a week. Patients will need to avoid physical stress or prolonged sport activities for a maximum of two weeks after a delicate balloon angioplasty.

After the initial two week recovery phase, most angioplasty patients can begin to safely return to low-level exercise. A graduated exercise program is recommended whereby patients initially perform several short bouts of exercise each day, progressively increasing to one or two longer bouts of exercise. As a precaution, all structured exercise should be cleared by a cardiologist before commencing. Exercise-based rehabilitation following percutaneous coronary intervention has shown improvement in recurrent angina, total exercise time, ST-segment decline, and maximum exercise tolerance.

Patients who experience swelling, bleeding or pain at the insertion site, develop fever, feel faint or weak, notice a change in temperature or color in the arm or leg that was used or have shortness of breath or chest pain should immediately seek medical advice.

Patients with stents are usually prescribed dual antiplatelet therapy which consists of a P2Y12 inhibitor, such as clopidogrel, which is taken at the same time as acetylsalicylic acid (aspirin). Dual antiplatelet therapy (DAPT) is recommended for 1 month following bare metal stent placement, for 3 months following a second generation drug-eluting stent placement, and for 6–12 months following a first generation drug-eluting stent placement. Dual antiplatelet therapy's properties are intended to prevent blood clots; however, they increase the risk of bleeding, so it is important to consider each patient's preferences, cardiac conditions, and bleeding risk when determining the duration of its treatment. Another important consideration is that concomitant use of clopidogrel and proton-pump inhibitors following coronary angiography is associated with significantly higher adverse cardiovascular complications such as major adverse cardiovascular events, stent thrombosis and myocardial infarction.

== History ==
Angioplasty was a first described by the US interventional radiologist Charles Dotter in 1964. Dotter pioneered modern medicine with the invention of angioplasty and the catheter-delivered stent, which were first used to treat peripheral arterial disease. On January 16, 1964, Dotter percutaneously dilated a tight, localized stenosis of the subsartorial artery in an 82-year-old woman with painful leg ischemia and gangrene who refused leg amputation. After successful dilation of the stenosis with a guide wire and coaxial Teflon catheters, the circulation returned to her leg. The dilated artery stayed open until her death from pneumonia two and a half years later. Charles Dotter is commonly known as the "Father of Interventional Radiology" and was nominated for the Nobel Prize in medicine in 1978.

The first percutaneous coronary angioplasty on an awake patient was performed in Zurich by the German cardiologist Andreas Gruentzig on September 16, 1977.

The first percutaneous coronary angioplasties in the United States were performed on the same day (March 1, 1978) by Simon H. Stertzer at Lenox Hill Hospital in New York and Richard K. Myler at St. Mary's Hospital in San Francisco. During the previous year, also at St. Mary's Hospital in San Francisco, Myler and Gruentzig had performed dilatations in the setting of bypass surgery to test the catheter concept before Gruentzig performed the first percutaneous transluminal coronary angioplasty in his catheterization lab in Zurich.

The initial form of angioplasty was 'plain old balloon angioplasty' without stenting, until the invention of bare metal stents in the mid-1980s to prevent the abrupt closure that sometimes occurred plain old balloon angioplasty.

Bare metal stents were found to cause in-stent restenosis as a result of neointimal hyperplasia and stent thrombosis, which led to the invention of drug-eluting stents with anti-proliferative drugs to combat in-stent restenosis.

The first coronary angioplasty with a drug delivery stent system was performed by Stertzer and Luis de la Fuente, at the Instituto Argentino de Diagnóstico y Tratamiento (English: Argentina Institute of Diagnosis and Treatment) in Buenos Aires, in 1999.

Ingemar Henry Lundquist invented the over-the-wire balloon catheter that is now used in the majority of angioplasty procedures in the world.

A subset of angioplasty, known as excimer laser coronary angioplasty, uses excimer lasers to remove small amounts of tissue, including undilatable and uncrossable lesions, in the artery in order to allow the balloon to more effectively compress plaque into the artery walls. Such work was first developed in 1984 following earlier work in 1980–1983, when Rangaswamy Srinivasan, Samuel Blum and James J. Wynne at IBM's T. J. Watson Research Center observed the effect of the ultraviolet excimer laser on biological materials. Intrigued, they investigated further, finding that the laser made clean, precise cuts that would be ideal for delicate surgeries. This resulted in a fundamental patent and Srinivasan, Blum and Wynne were elected to the National Inventors Hall of Fame in 2002. In 2012, the team members were honored with National Medal of Technology and Innovation by the President Barack Obama for their work related to the excimer laser. Robert Ginsburg deployed the first used of excimer laser coronary angioplasty in 1984 on a patient with severe stenosis of the deep femoral artery and a threatened limb.
