= Interventional cardiology =

Catheter-based treatment of structural heart diseases

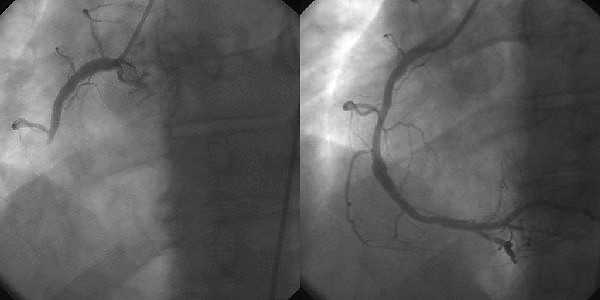
Coronary angiography and angioplasty in acute myocardial infarction (left: Right Coronary Artery [RCA] closed, right: successfully dilated)

Interventional cardiology is a branch of cardiology that deals specifically with the catheter based treatment of structural heart diseases. Andreas Gruentzig is considered the father of interventional cardiology after the development of angioplasty by interventional radiologist Charles Dotter.

Many procedures can be performed on the heart by catheterization. This most commonly involves the insertion of a sheath into the femoral artery (but, in practice, any large peripheral artery or vein) and cannulating the heart under X-ray visualization (most commonly fluoroscopy). The radial artery may also be used for cannulation; this approach offers several advantages, including the accessibility of the artery in most patients, the easy control of bleeding even in anticoagulated patients, the enhancement of comfort because patients are capable of sitting up and walking immediately following the procedure, and the near absence of clinically significant sequelae in patients with a normal Allen test. Downsides to this approach include spasm of the artery and pain, inability to use larger catheters needed in some procedures, and more radiation exposure. But, in recent times radial approach is getting popularity due to its patient comfort after procedure.

The main advantages of using the interventional cardiology or radiology approach are the avoidance of the scars and pain, and long post-operative recovery. Additionally, interventional cardiology procedure of primary angioplasty is now the gold standard of care for an acute myocardial infarction. It involves the extraction of clots from occluded coronary arteries and deployment of stents and balloons through a small hole made in a major artery, which has given it the name "pin-hole surgery" (as opposed to "key-hole surgery").

== Procedures ==
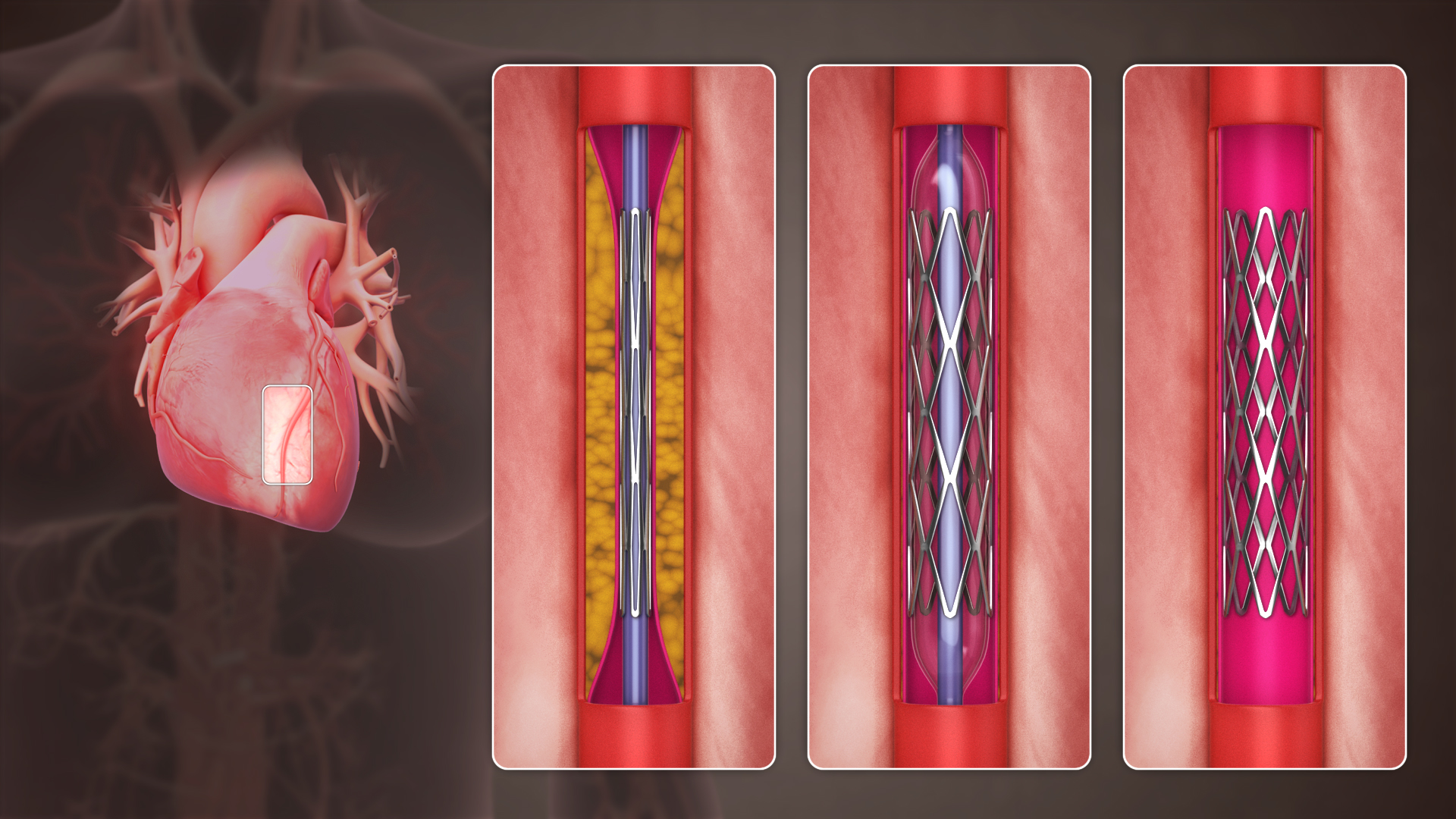
3D Medical Animation still shot of Percutaneous coronary intervention

Angioplasty
is an intervention to dilate either arteries or veins.
Percutaneous coronary intervention (PCI/Coronary angioplasty)
the use of angioplasty for the treatment of obstruction of coronary arteries as a result of coronary artery disease. A deflated balloon catheter is advanced into the obstructed artery and inflated to relieve the narrowing; certain devices such as coronary stents can be deployed to keep the blood vessel open. Various other procedures can also be performed at the same time. After a heart attack, it can be restricted to the culprit vessel (the one whose obstruction or thrombosis is suspected of causing the event) or complete revascularization; complete revascularization is more efficacious in terms of major adverse cardiac events and all-cause mortality.
PCI is also used in people after other forms of myocardial infarction or unstable angina where there is a high risk of further events. The use of PCI in addition to anti-angina medication in stable angina may reduce the number of patients with angina attacks for up to 3 years following the therapy, but it does not reduce the risk of death, future myocardial infarction, or need for other interventions.
Valvuloplasty
It is the dilation of narrowed cardiac valves (usually mitral, aortic, or pulmonary).
Congenital heart defect correction
Percutaneous approaches can be employed to correct atrial septal and ventricular septal defects, closure of a patent ductus arteriosus, and angioplasty of the great vessels.
Percutaneous valve replacement
An alternative to open heart surgery, percutaneous valve replacement is the replacement of a heart valve using percutaneous methods. This is performed on the aortic valve (percutaneous aortic valve replacement/TAVI procedure), pulmonary valve and recently the mitral valve
Percutaneous valve repair
An alternative to open heart surgery, percutaneous valve repair is performed on the mitral valve using the MONARC system or MitraClip system
Coronary thrombectomy
Coronary thrombectomy involves the removal of a thrombus (blood clot) from the coronary arteries.

Open heart surgery of the heart is performed by a cardiothoracic surgeon. Some interventional cardiology procedures are performed in conjunction with a cardiothoracic surgeon.

== Occupational hazards ==
There are a number of occupational hazards associated with interventional cardiology procedures. Since both interventional cardiologists and electrophysiologists work in close proximity to the patient, and therefore close to the ionising radiation source used in imaging, they are exposed to radiation under their normal working conditions. To mitigate the radiation hazard, a number of shielding methods may be employed, such as lead aprons, screens, eyewear and thyroid shields, which considerably reduce radiation doses to key organs when properly used. However, the considerable mass of these devices can also cause risks to health, particularly in terms of lower back pain.

== Education ==
In the US and Canada, interventional cardiology requires a minimum of seven years of post-graduate medical education and up to 9 years of post-graduate medical education for those wanting to perform advanced structural heart procedures.

- Undergraduate degree (4 years)
- Medical degree (4 years)
- Internal Medicine residency (3 years)
- Cardiology fellowship (3 years)
- Interventional Cardiology fellowship (1–2 years)
- Structural Heart Intervention fellowship (1 year)

== See also ==
- Interventional radiology
- Vascular surgery
- Catheter
- Cannula
- Stent
- Restenosis
