= Coronary catheterization =

Radiography of heart and blood vessels

- Cardiac catheterization lab
- Specialty: Interventional cardiology

Angiocardiography
- ICD-9-CM: 88.50-88.58
- MeSH: D000790

A coronary catheterization is a minimally invasive procedure to access the coronary circulation and blood filled chambers of the heart using a catheter. It is performed for both diagnostic and interventional (treatment) purposes.

Coronary catheterization is one of the several cardiology diagnostic tests and procedures. Specifically, through the injection of a liquid radiocontrast agent and illumination with X-rays, angiocardiography allows the recognition of occlusion, stenosis, restenosis, thrombosis or aneurysmal enlargement of the coronary artery lumens; heart chamber size; heart muscle contraction performance; and some aspects of heart valve function. Important internal heart and lung blood pressures, not measurable from outside the body, can be accurately measured during the test. The relevant problems that the test deals with most commonly occur as a result of advanced atherosclerosis – atheroma activity within the wall of the coronary arteries. Less frequently, valvular, heart muscle, or arrhythmia issues are the primary focus of the test.

Coronary artery luminal narrowing reduces the flow reserve for oxygenated blood to the heart, typically producing intermittent angina. Very advanced luminal occlusion usually produces a heart attack. However, it has been increasingly recognized, since the late 1980s, that coronary catheterization does not allow the recognition of the presence or absence of coronary atherosclerosis itself, only significant luminal changes which have occurred as a result of end stage complications of the atherosclerotic process. See IVUS and atheroma for a better understanding of this issue.

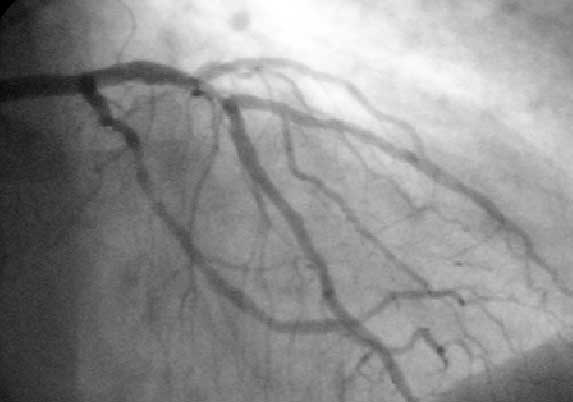
A coronary angiogram (an X-ray with radiocontrast agent in the coronary arteries) that shows the left coronary circulation. The distal left main coronary artery (LMCA) is in the left upper quadrant of the image. Its main branches (also visible) are the left circumflex artery (LCX), which courses top-to-bottom initially and then toward the centre/bottom, and the left anterior descending (LAD) artery, which courses from left-to-right on the image and then down the middle of the image to project underneath the distal LCX. The LAD, as is usual, has two large diagonal branches, which arise at the centre-top of the image and course toward the centre/right of the image.

== History ==
The technique of angiography itself was first developed in 1927 by the Portuguese physician Egas Moniz at the University of Lisbon for cerebral angiography, the viewing of brain vasculature by X-ray radiation with the aid of a contrast medium introduced by catheter.

Heart catheterization was first performed in 1929 when the German physician Werner Forssmann inserted a plastic tube in his cubital vein and guided it to the right chamber of the heart. He took an x-ray to prove his success and published it on November 5, 1929, with the title "Über die Sondierung des rechten Herzens" (About probing of the right heart).

In the early 1940s, André Cournand, in collaboration with Dickinson Richards, performed more systematic measurements of the hemodynamics of the heart. For their work in the discovery of cardiac catheterization and hemodynamic measurements, Cournand, Forssmann, and Richards shared the Nobel Prize in Physiology or Medicine in 1956. The first radial access for angiography can be traced back to 1953, where Eduardo Pereira, in Lisbon, Portugal, first cannulated the radial artery to perform a coronary angiogram.

In 1960 F. Mason Sones, a pediatric cardiologist at the Cleveland Clinic, accidentally injected radiocontrast in a coronary artery instead of the left ventricle. Although the patient had a reversible cardiac arrest, Sones and Shirey developed the procedure further, and are credited with the discovery (Connolly 2002); they published a series of 1,000 patents in 1966 (Proudfit et al.).

Since the late 1970s, building on the pioneering work of Charles Dotter in 1964 and especially Andreas Gruentzig starting in 1977, coronary catheterization has been extended to therapeutic uses: (a) the performance of less invasive physical treatment for angina and some of the complications of severe atherosclerosis, (b) treating heart attacks before complete damage has occurred and (c) research for better understanding of the pathology of coronary artery disease and atherosclerosis.

In the early 1960s, cardiac catheterization frequently took several hours and involved significant complications for as many as 2–3% of patients. With multiple incremental improvements over time, simple coronary catheterization examinations are now commonly done more rapidly and with significantly improved outcomes.

== Indications ==
Indications for cardiac catheterization include the following:

- Heart Attack (includes ST elevation MI, Non-ST Elevation MI, Unstable Angina)
- Abnormal Stress Test
- New-onset unexplained heart failure
- Survival of sudden cardiac death or dangerous cardiac arrhythmia
- Persistent chest pain despite optimal medical therapy
- Workup of suspected Prinzmetal angina (coronary vasospasm)

== Patient participation ==
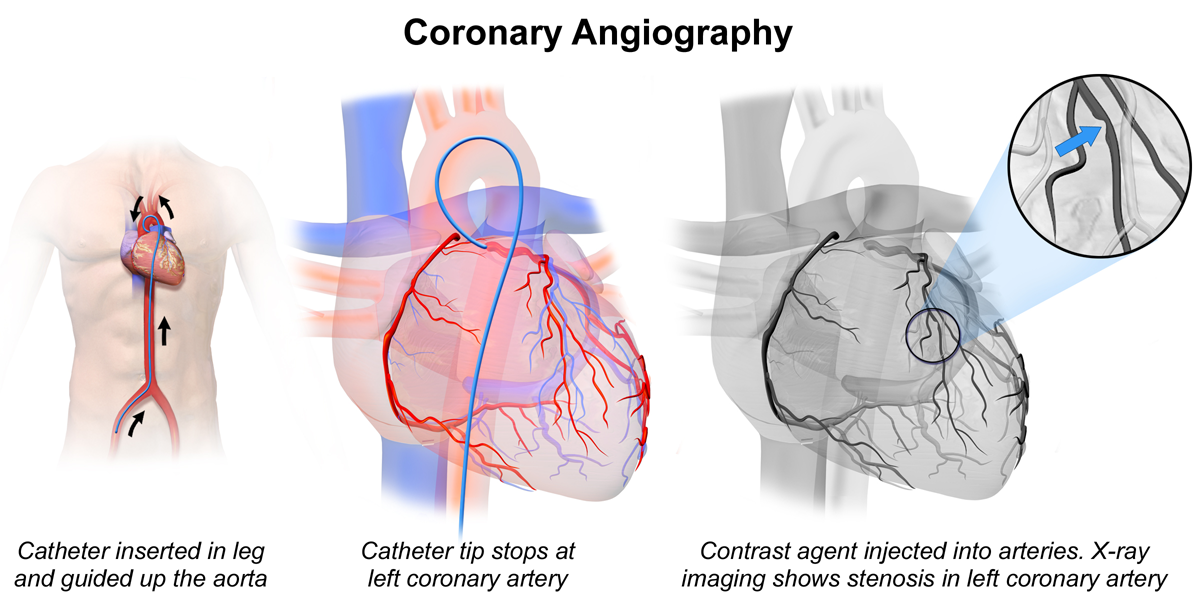
Coronary Angiography (CAG).

The patient being examined or treated is usually awake during catheterization, ideally with only local anaesthesia such as lidocaine and minimal general sedation, throughout the procedure. Performing the procedure with the patient awake is safer as the patient can immediately report any discomfort or problems and thereby facilitate rapid correction of any undesirable events. Medical monitors fail to give a comprehensive view of the patient's immediate well-being; how the patient feels is often a most reliable indicator of procedural safety.

Death, myocardial infarction, stroke, serious ventricular arrhythmia, and major vascular complications each occur in less than 1% of patients undergoing catheterization. However, though the imaging portion of the examination is often brief, because of setup and safety issues, the patient is often in the lab for 20–45 minutes. Any of multiple technical difficulties, while not endangering the patient (indeed added to protect the patient's interests), can significantly increase the examination time.

== Equipment ==
Coronary catheterization is performed in a catheterization lab, usually located within a hospital. With current designs, the patient must lie relatively flat on a narrow, minimally padded, radiolucent (transparent to X-ray) table. The X-ray source and imaging camera equipment are on opposite sides of the patient's chest and freely move, under motorized control, around the patient's chest so images can be taken quickly from multiple angles. More advanced equipment, termed a bi-plane cath lab, uses two sets of X-ray source and imaging cameras, each free to move independently, which allows two sets of images to be taken with each injection of radiocontrast agent. The equipment and installation setup to perform such testing typically represents a capital expenditure of US$2–5 million (2004), sometimes more, partially repeated every few years.

== Diagnostic procedures ==
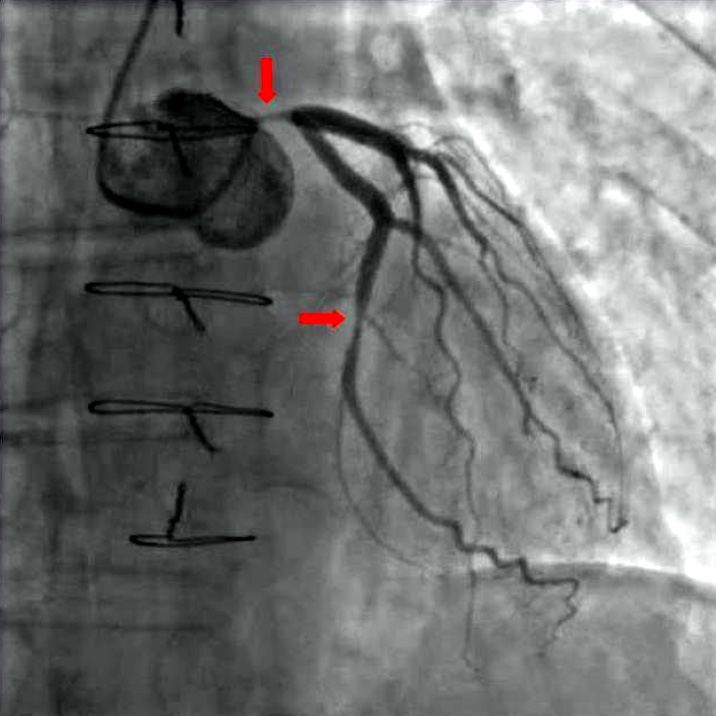
Coronary angiography of a critical sub-occlusion of the common trunk of the left coronary artery and the circumflex artery. (See arrows)

During coronary catheterization (often referred to as a "cath" or "cardiac cath" by physicians), blood pressures are recorded and fluoroscopy (X-ray motion picture) shadow-grams of the blood inside the coronary arteries are recorded. In order to create the X-ray pictures, a physician guides a small tube-like device called a catheter, typically ~2.0 mm (6-French) in diameter, through the large arteries of the body until the tip is just within the opening of one of the coronary arteries. By design, the catheter is smaller than the lumen of the artery it is placed in; internal (intra-arterial) blood pressures are monitored through the catheter to verify that the catheter does not block blood flow (as indicated by "dampening" of the blood pressure).

The catheter is itself designed to be radiodense for visibility and it allows a clear, watery, blood compatible radiocontrast agent, commonly called an X-ray dye, to be selectively injected and mixed with the blood flowing within the artery. Typically 3–8 cc of the radiocontrast agent is injected for each image to make the blood flow visible for about 3–5 seconds as the radiocontrast agent is rapidly washed away into the coronary capillaries and then coronary veins. Without the X-ray dye injection, the blood and surrounding heart tissues appear, on X-ray, as only a mildly-shape-changing, otherwise uniform water density mass; no details of the blood and internal organ structure are discernible. The radiocontrast within the blood allows visualization of the blood flow within the arteries or heart chambers, depending on where it is injected.

If atheroma, or clots, are protruding into the lumen, producing narrowing, the narrowing may be seen instead as increased haziness within the X-ray shadow images of the blood/dye column within that portion of the artery; this is as compared to adjacent, presumed healthier, less stenotic areas.

For guidance regarding catheter positions during the examination, the physician mostly relies on detailed knowledge of internal anatomy, guide wire and catheter behavior and intermittently, briefly uses fluoroscopy and a low X-ray dose to visualize when needed. This is done without saving recordings of these brief looks. When the physician is ready to record diagnostic views, which are saved and can be more carefully scrutinized later, he activates the equipment to apply a significantly higher X-ray dose, termed cine, in order to create better quality motion picture images, having sharper radiodensity contrast, typically at 30 frames per second. The physician controls both the contrast injection, fluoroscopy and cine application timing so as to minimize the total amount of radiocontrast injected and times the X-ray to the injection so as to minimize the total amount of X-ray used. Doses of radiocontrast agents and X-ray exposure times are routinely recorded in an effort to maximize safety.

Though not the focus of the test, calcification within the artery walls, located in the outer edges of atheroma within the artery walls, is sometimes recognizable on fluoroscopy (without contrast injection) as radiodense halo rings partially encircling, and separated from the blood filled lumen by the interceding radiolucent atheroma tissue and endothelial lining. Calcification, even though usually present, is usually only visible when quite advanced and calcified sections of the artery wall happen to be viewed on end tangentially through multiple rings of calcification, so as to create enough radiodensity to be visible on fluoroscopy.

=== For congenital malformations ===
Angiocardiography can be used to detect and diagnose congenital defects in the heart and adjacent vessels. In this context, the use of angiocardiography has declined with the introduction of echocardiography. However, angiocardiography is still in use for selected cases as it provides a higher level of anatomical detail than echocardiography.

== Therapeutic procedures ==
By changing the diagnostic catheter to a guiding catheter, physicians can also pass a variety of instruments through the catheter and into the artery to a lesion site. The most commonly used are 0.014-inch-diameter (0.36 mm) guide wires and the balloon dilation catheters.

By injecting radiocontrast agent through a tiny passage extending down the balloon catheter and into the balloon, the balloon is progressively expanded. The hydraulic pressures are chosen and applied by the physician, according to how the balloon within the stenosis (abnormal narrowing in a blood vessel) responds. The radiocontrast filled balloon is watched under fluoroscopy (it typically assumes a "dog bone" shape imposed on the outside of the balloon by the stenosis as the balloon is expanded), as it opens. As much hydraulic brute force is applied as judged needed and visualized to be effective to make the stenosis of the artery lumen visibly enlarge.

Typical normal coronary artery pressures are in the <200 mmHg range (27 kPa). The hydraulic pressures applied within the balloon may extend to as high as 19000 mmHg (2,500 kPa). Prevention of over-enlargement is achieved by choosing balloons manufactured out of high tensile strength clear plastic membranes. The balloon is initially folded around the catheter, near the tip, to create a small cross-sectional profile to facilitate passage through luminal stenotic areas, and is designed to inflate to a specific pre-designed diameter. If over-inflated, the balloon material simply tears and allows the inflating radiocontrast agent to simply escape into the blood.

Additionally, several other devices can be advanced into the artery via a guiding catheter. These include laser catheters, stent catheters, IVUS catheters, Doppler catheter, pressure or temperature measurement catheter and various clot and grinding or removal devices. Most of these devices have turned out to be niche devices, only useful in a small percentage of situations or for research.

Stents, which are specially manufactured expandable stainless steel mesh tubes, mounted on a balloon catheter, are the most commonly used device beyond the balloon catheter. When the stent/balloon device is positioned within the stenosis, the balloon is inflated which, in turn, expands the stent and the artery. The balloon is removed and the stent remains in place, supporting the inner artery walls in the more open, dilated position. Current stents generally cost around $1,000 to 3,000 each (US 2004 dollars), the drug-coated ones being the more expensive.

== Advances in catheter-based physical treatments ==
Interventional procedures have been plagued by restenosis due to the formation of endothelial tissue overgrowth at the lesion site. Restenosis is the body's response to the injury of the vessel wall from angioplasty and to the stent as a foreign body. As assessed in clinical trials during the late 1980 and 1990s, using only balloon angioplasty (POBA, plain old balloon angioplasty), up to 50% of patients developed significant restenosis; but that percentage has dropped to the single to lower two-digit range with the introduction of drug-eluting stents. Sirolimus, paclitaxel, and everolimus are the three drugs used in coatings which are currently FDA approved in the United States. As opposed to bare metal, drug-eluting stents are covered with a medicine that is slowly dispersed with the goal of suppressing the restenosis reaction. The key to the success of drug coating has been (a) choosing effective agents, (b) developing ways of adequately binding the drugs to the stainless surface of the stent struts (the coating must stay bound despite marked handling and stent deformation stresses), and (c) developing coating controlled release mechanisms that release the drug slowly over about 30 days. One of the newest innovations in coronary stents is the development of a dissolving stent. Abbott Laboratories has used a dissolvable material, polylactic acid, that will completely absorb within 2 years of being implanted.

== Alternative approaches ==
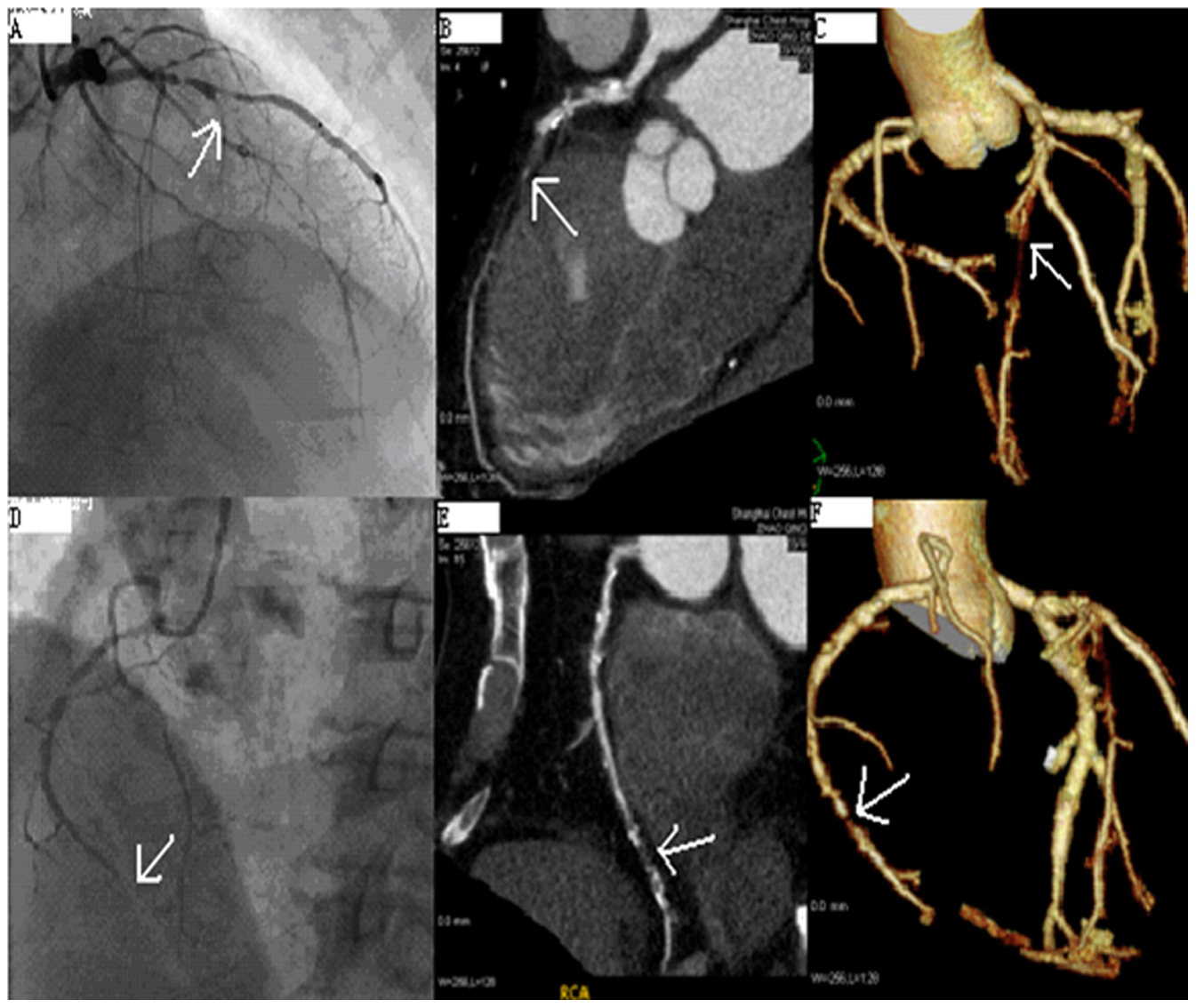
Angiography (left) and CT (middle and right) of chronic total occlusion lesions at the left anterior descending coronary artery (LAD) and right coronary artery (RCA).

CT angiography can act as a less invasive alternative to Catheter angiography. Instead of a catheter being inserted into a vein or artery, CT angiography involves only the injection of a CT-visible dye into the arm or hand via an IV line. CT angiography lowers the risk of arterial perforation and catheter site infection. It provides 3D images that can be studied on computer, and also allows measurement of heart ventricle size. Infarct area and arterial calcium can also be observed (however those require a somewhat higher radiation exposure). That said, one advantage retained by Catheter angiography is the ability of the physician to perform procedure such as balloon angioplasty or insertion of a stent to improve blood flow to the artery.

== Radiation dosage ==
=== Angiography ===
Imaging in coronary angiograms is performed via fluoroscopy using X-rays, which pose a potential for increasing the patient's risk of radiation-induced cancer. The risk increases with the exposure time, consisting of 1) time guiding the probe into and out of the heart and 2) time illuminating the contrast agent to perform the angiogram. Absorbed radiation is also a function of body mass index, with obese patients having twice the dose of normal-weight patients; exposure to the operator was also doubled. Coronary angiograms can be done either transradial (through the wrist) or transfemoral (through the groin). The transradial route results in somewhat greater patient and operator exposure. Overall, patient exposure can range from 2 millisieverts (equivalent of about 20 chest x-ray plates) to 20 millisieverts. For a given patient, exposure can vary within an institution and between institutions by up to 121%.

Radiation exposure to the operator can be reduced by the use of protective equipment. Exposure to the patient can be reduced by minimizing fluoroscopy time.

== See also ==
- Angiography
- Interventional cardiology
- Fractional flow reserve
