= Neointimal hyperplasia =

Neointimal hyperplasia refers to proliferation and migration of vascular smooth muscle cells primarily in the tunica intima, resulting in the thickening of arterial walls and decreased arterial lumen space. Neointimal hyperplasia is the major cause of restenosis after percutaneous coronary interventions such as stenting or angioplasty. The term neointima is used because the cells in the hyperplastic regions of the vascular wall have histological characteristics of both intima and normal artery cells.

== Causes ==
Neointimal hyperplasia first develops with damage to the arterial wall, followed by platelet aggregation at the site of injury, recruitment of inflammatory cells, proliferation and migration of vascular smooth muscle cells, and collagen deposition.

Mechanical injury of arterials due to stretching of arterial walls with a balloon catheter results in the recruitment of cells such as monocytes, macrophages, and neutrophils to the site of injury. Macrophages in particular express many growth factors, cytokines, and enzymes that facilitate vascular smooth muscle cell migration and proliferation.

C-reactive protein is a systemic inflammatory mediator correlated with neointimal hyperplasia, but it is still unknown if this protein is a marker of increased risk or a causative agent of the condition.

== Prevention ==
P radioactive β-emitting stents were used in coronary artery lesions with results showing inhibition of neointimal hyperplasia in a dose-dependent manner. A 6-month follow up post-implantation of the radioactive stents showed little adverse side-effects in the patients. However, more recent studies have shown that patients have a late progression of in-stent neointimal hyperplasia after 1 year of radioactive stent implantation, suggesting a delay in the development of neointimal hyperplasia rather than a prevention or decline of the condition.

Drug-eluting stents coated with anti-proliferative chemicals are used to counteract neointimal hyperplasia after stents placement. Drug-eluting stents that release resveratrol and quercetin show promise with marked reduction in intimal hyperplasia compared to bare, metal stents.

== Treatment ==
Anti-inflammatory treatment is effective in limiting the development of neointimal hyperplasia. In rabbits, the use of IL-10 to reduce function of circulating monocytes and inhibition of leukocyte adhesion with antibodies reduced formation of neointimal hyperplasia after angioplasty and stenting.

Nitric oxide-based treatment for the treatment of cardiovascular pathologies has shown promise in the treatment of neointimal hyperplasia. However, the difficulty in controlled, local release of nitric oxide has limited its clinical use for neointimal hyperplasia. Polymer-based perivascular wraps are attracting growing interest for their potential use to deliver nitric oxide and other drugs in the treatment of neointimal hyperplasia.

Exendin-4, a glucagon-like peptide-1 receptor (GLP-1) agonist used as drug treatment for type 2 diabetes inhibits neointimal hyperplasia. The use of PKA inhibitors reverses the inhibitory effects of exendin-4, suggesting that the anti-proliferative effects of exendin-4 involves the cAMP-PKA pathway. Exendin-4 inhibits TNFα production by macrophages to reduce inflammation, which may play another role in inhibiting neointimal hyperplasia.

== See also ==
- Angioplasty
- Drug-eluting stent
- Restenosis
- Stent
