= Coronary stent =

Medical stent implanted into coronary arteries

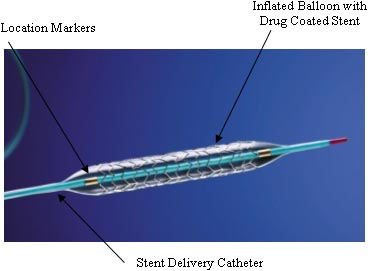
- An example of a coronary stent. This Taxus stent is labeled as a drug-eluting stent.
- ICD-9-CM: 36.06

A coronary stent is a tube-shaped device placed in the coronary arteries that supply blood to the heart to keep the arteries open in patients suffering from coronary heart disease. The vast majority of stents used in modern interventional cardiology are drug-eluting stents (DES). They are used in a medical procedure called percutaneous coronary intervention (PCI). Coronary stents are divided into two broad types: drug-eluting and bare metal stents. As of 2023, drug-eluting stents were used in more than 90% of all PCI procedures. Stents reduce angina (chest pain) and have been shown to improve survival and decrease adverse events after a patient has suffered a heart attack—medically termed an acute myocardial infarction.

Similar stents and stenting procedures are used in atherosclerosis of arterial vessels of the limbs—particularly in the legs, such as in peripheral artery disease.

== Medical uses ==
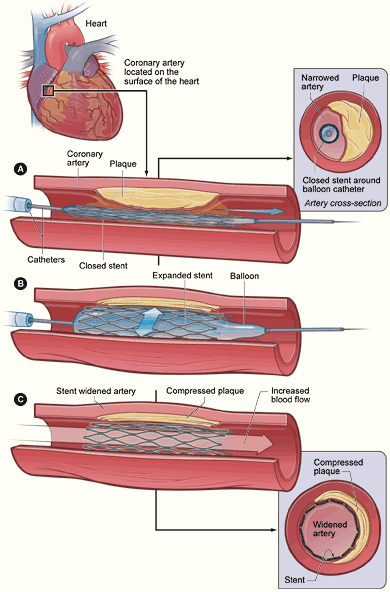
Diagram of stent placement. In A, the catheter is inserted across the lesion. In B, the balloon is inflated, expanding the stent and compressing the plaque. In C, the catheter and deflated balloon have been removed. Before-and-after cross sections of the artery show the results of the stent placement.

Arterial Stenting 3D Medical Animation

Cardiac stenting is achieved by PCI procedures in two distinct medical situations, when a patient has clearly suffered a heart attack and therefore PCI/stenting is being used in an emergency setting, termed 'primary PCI'. It is also a procedure used in patients that are exhibiting prolonged clinical symptoms of coronary artery narrowing (angina, evidence from stress test data, various imaging techniques etc.).

Patients not undergoing primary PCI are usually awake during the placement of a coronary stent, though local anesthetics are used at the site of catheter entry, to ensure there is no pain. In reality practices vary, though patient comfort is a priority. Various techniques of pain management and anesthesia are practiced during current PCI stent placement procedures.

The catheter/stent system is introduced into the body by penetrating a peripheral artery (an artery located in the arm or leg) and passed through the arterial system to deliver the DES into the blocked coronary artery. The stent is then expanded to dilate (open) blocked or narrowed coronary arteries (narrowed by plaque buildup), caused by a condition known as atherosclerosis. Peripheral arterial access is usually via the femoral (upper leg) or the radial artery (arm/wrist) and less commonly performed via the brachial or ulnar artery (wrist/arm). Historically, controlling bleeding at the point of arterial access after the procedure was an issue, modern arterial pressure bands and arterial closure system now exist which have helped control post procedure bleeding, but bleeding after the procedure is still a matter of concern.

The 'stent tube mesh' is initially 'collapsed' onto the catheter, that catheter contains an inflating balloon component. In this collapsed state, it is small enough to be passed through 'relatively' narrow arteries and then inflated and compressed firmly against the diseased artery wall, by air pressure introduced via the still attached catheter, inflation time and pressure are recorded during this placement procedure. Consider an umbrella metaphor, initially unopened and then opened.

Many significant treatment decisions are made in real time during the actual stent placement, the Interventional Cardiologist uses Intravascular ultrasound (IVUS) and fluoroscopic imaging data to assess the exact location, the true occlusion status. A radiopaque contrast dye is passed through the catheter and is used to visualize the arteries and evaluate the location of the narrowed vessel. This information is used in real time to decide how best to treat the occlusion(s). Information regarding the health and anatomy of the broader coronary blood supply can also be evaluated; as coronary vasculature varies from individual to individual. This data is captured on video and is valuable if any further treatments of a patient are necessary.

== Recovery and rehabilitation ==
For many patients stenting procedures do not require an in-hospital stay. Much of the time spent in immediate recovery post stenting is to ensure the access site is not bleeding. The patient is generally monitored using ECG etc. Medications to prevent a blood clot from forming within the stent are given directly after the stenting procedure (if not already given prior), commonly in the form of an immediate oral loading dose of aspirin in combination with another anti-platelet agent, typically clopidogrel, ticagrelor or prasugrel, depending on the situation. Maintenance dual anti-platelet use is usually continued post-stenting for a given time. For patients undergoing PCI after a heart attack extended, stays are very dependent on the degree of damage caused by the event.

As a stent/DES is a medical device, patients are given a 'medical device card' with information on the implanted DES and a medical device serial number; this is important and is useful in future potential medical procedures. This is also the case of several arterial closure systems which are also medical devices. There is usually soreness at the point of entry into the arterial system, and fairly large hematomas (significant bruising) are very common. This soreness usually improves after a week or so. Usually, patients are advised to 'take it easy' for a week or two and are instructed to be cautious not to lift any substantial weights. This is primarily to ensure the access site heals. Follow up appointments within a week or two of the procedure with a cardiologist or primary care provider/GP are a standard practice.

It is a standard practice to have further follow-up examinations every three to six months for the first year, though these practices do vary. Further diagnostic coronary angiography is not routinely indicated after coronary stent implantation. If progression of heart disease is suspected, a stress test could be performed; patients who develop symptoms or show evidence of ischemia in a stress test may undergo diagnostic cardiac re-catheterization.

Physical examinations play an important role after PCI-stenting procedures. Those patients at high risk of suffering from complications and those with more complexed coronary issues, angiography may be indicated regardless of the findings of non-invasive stress tests.

Cardiac rehabilitation activities are dependent on many factors, but largely are connected to the degree of heart muscle damage prior to the PCI/DES procedure. Many patients who undergo this procedure have not had a heart attack, and may have no notable damage to their hearts. Others may have had a heart attack and the amount of damage to their heart's ability to supply the body with oxygenated blood might be grossly impaired. Rehabilitation activities are prescribed to fit each individuals needs.

== Risks ==
Though the chances of having complications from a PCI are small, some serious complications include the development of arrhythmias, adverse reactions/effects of the dye used in the procedure, infection, restenosis, clotting, blood vessel damage, and bleeding at catheter insertion site.

=== Re-occlusion ===
Coronary artery stents, typically a metal framework, can be placed inside the artery to help keep it open. However, as the stent is a foreign object (not native to the body), it incites an immune response. This may cause scar tissue (cell proliferation) to rapidly grow over the stent and cause a neointimal hyperplasia. In addition, if the stent damages the artery wall there is a strong tendency for clots to form at the site. Since platelets are involved in the clotting process, patients must take dual antiplatelet therapy starting immediately before or after stenting: usually an ADP receptor antagonist (e.g. clopidogrel or ticagrelor) for up to one year and aspirin indefinitely.

However, in some cases the dual antiplatelet therapy may be insufficient to fully prevent clots that may result in stent thrombosis; these clots and cell proliferation may sometimes cause standard ("bare-metal") stents to become blocked (restenosis). Drug-eluting stents were developed with the intent of dealing with this problem: by releasing an antiproliferative drug (drugs typically used against cancer or as immunosuppressants), they can help reduce the incidence of "in-stent restenosis" (re-narrowing). A 2017 Cochrane review comparing bare-metal and drug-eluding stents found that the latter may result in reduced incidence of serious adverse events. However, at maximum follow up, it found no difference between the two on cardiovascular mortality and myocardial infarction.

=== Restenosis ===
One of the drawbacks of vascular stents is the potential for restenosis via the development of a thick smooth muscle tissue inside the lumen, the so-called neointima. Development of a neointima is variable but can at times be so severe as to re-occlude the vessel lumen (restenosis), especially in the case of smaller-diameter vessels, which often results in reintervention. Consequently, current research focuses on the reduction of neointima after stent placement. Substantial improvements have been made, including the use of more biocompatible materials, anti-inflammatory drug-eluting stents, resorbable stents, and others. Restenosis can be treated with a reintervention using the same method.

== Usage considerations ==
The value of stenting in those undergoing a heart attack (by immediately alleviating the obstruction) is clearly defined in multiple studies, but studies have failed to find reduction in hard endpoints for stents vs. medical therapy in stable angina patients (see controversies in Percutaneous coronary intervention). The artery-opening stent can temporarily alleviate chest pain, but does not contribute to longevity.

The "vast majority of heart attacks do not originate with obstructions that narrow arteries." Further, "researchers say, most heart attacks do not occur because an artery is narrowed by plaque. Instead, they say, heart attacks occur when an area of plaque bursts, a clot forms over the area and blood flow is abruptly blocked. In 75 to 80 percent of cases, the plaque that erupts was not obstructing an artery and would not be stented or bypassed. The dangerous plaque is soft and fragile, produces no symptoms and would not be seen as an obstruction to blood flow." The use of statins to create more stable plaques has been well studied, and their use along with both PCI/Stenting and anticoagulant therapies is considered a broader treatment strategy.

Some cardiologists believe that stents are overused; however, in certain patient groups, such as the elderly, studies have found evidence of under-use.

== Research ==
While revascularisation (by stenting or bypass surgery) is of clear benefit in reducing mortality and morbidity in patients with acute symptoms (acute coronary syndromes) including myocardial infarction, their benefit is less marked in stable patients. Clinical trials have failed to demonstrate that coronary stents improve survival over best medical treatment.

- The COURAGE trial compared PCI with optimum medical therapy. Of note, the trial excluded a large number of patients at the outset and undertook angiography in all patients at baseline, thus the results only apply to a subset of patients and should not be overgeneralised. COURAGE concluded that in patients with stable coronary artery disease PCI did not reduce the death, myocardial infarction or other major cardiac events when added to optimum medical therapy.
- The MASS-II trial compared PCI, CABG and optimum medical therapy for the treatment of multi-vessel coronary artery disease. The MASS-II trial showed no difference in cardiac death or acute MI among patients in the CABG, PCI, or MT group. However, it did show a significantly greater need for additional revascularization procedures in patients who underwent PCI.
- The SYNTAX Trial is a manufacturer-funded trial with a primary endpoint of death, cardiovascular events, and myocardial infarction, and also the need for repeat vascularization, in patients with blocked or narrowed arteries. Patients were randomized to either CABG surgery or a drug-eluting stent (the Boston Scientific TAXUS paclitaxel-eluting stent). SYNTAX found the two strategies to be similar for hard endpoints (death and MI). Those receiving PCI required more repeat revascularisation (hence the primary endpoint analysis did not find PCI to be non-inferior), but those undergoing CABG had significantly more strokes pre or perioperatively. Use of the SYNTAX risk score is being investigated as a method of identifying those multivessel disease patients in whom PCI is a reasonable option vs those in whom CABG remains the preferred strategy.
- Ischemia, a large trial of 5,179 participants followed for a median of three and a half years that was funded by the US federal government, was skeptical of the benefits of coronary stents. It divided participants into ones which received drug therapy alone, and those that also received bypass surgery or stents. The drug therapy alone group did not fare any differently than the group that received the stents as well as drug therapy. Ischemia did find that stents seemed to help some patients with angina, however.

Several other clinical trials have been performed to examine the efficacy of coronary stenting and compare with other treatment options. A consensus of the medical community does not exist.

== History ==
The first stent was patented in 1972 by Robert A. Ersek, MD based on work he had done in animals in 1969 at the University of Minnesota. In addition to intervascular stents, he also developed the first stent-supported porcine valve that can be implanted transcutaneously in 7 minutes, eliminating open-heart surgery.

In development are stents with biocompatible surface coatings which do not elute drugs, and also absorbable stents (metal or polymer).

== See also ==
- stents by destination organ:
  - ureteric stent – Medical device
  - prostatic stent
  - esophageal stent
- stents by properties
  - bare-metal stent
  - bioresorbable stent – Medical stent that dissolves or is absorbed by the body
  - drug-eluting stent – Medical implant to treat narrowed arteries
