= Percutaneous coronary intervention =

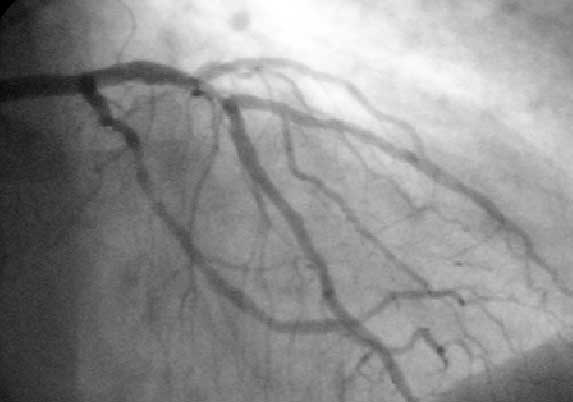
- A coronary angiogram showing the circulation in the left coronary artery and its branches.
- Other names: Percutaneous transluminal coronary angioplasty (PTCA), coronary angioplasty
- Specialty: Interventional cardiology
- ICD-9-CM: 36.09, 00.66

Percutaneous coronary intervention (PCI) is a minimally invasive non-surgical procedure used to treat narrowing of the coronary arteries of the heart found in coronary artery disease. The procedure is used to place and deploy coronary stents, a permanent wire-meshed tube, to open narrowed coronary arteries. PCI is considered 'non-surgical' as it uses a small hole in a peripheral artery (leg/arm) to gain access to the arterial system; an equivalent surgical procedure would involve the opening of the chest wall to gain access to the heart area. The term 'coronary angioplasty with stent' is synonymous with PCI. The procedure visualises the blood vessels via fluoroscopic imaging and contrast dyes. PCI is performed by an interventional cardiologist in a catheterization laboratory setting.

Patients who undergo PCI broadly fall into two patient groups. Those who are suffering from a heart attack and are in a critical care emergency room setting and patients who are clinically at a high risk of suffering a heart attack at some future point. PCI is an alternative to the invasive surgery coronary artery bypass grafting (CABG, often referred to as "bypass surgery"), which bypasses narrowed arteries by grafting vessels from other locations in the body. Coronary angioplasty was first introduced in 1977 by Andreas Gruentzig in Switzerland.

== Medical uses ==
Heart and arteries
- Coronary arteries provide blood to the heart, originating from the aorta and surrounding the heart. Coronary arteries are subject to narrowing, resulting in reduced blood supply to the cardiac muscle.

Identifiers
- MeSH: D062645

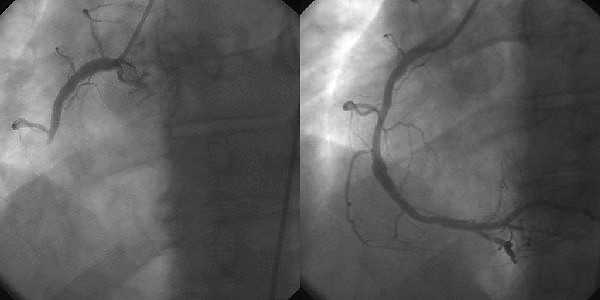
Coronary angiography and angioplasty in acute myocardial infarction (left: RCA closed, right: RCA successfully dilated)

Tight, critical stenosis (95%) of the proximal LAD in a patient with Wellens' warning

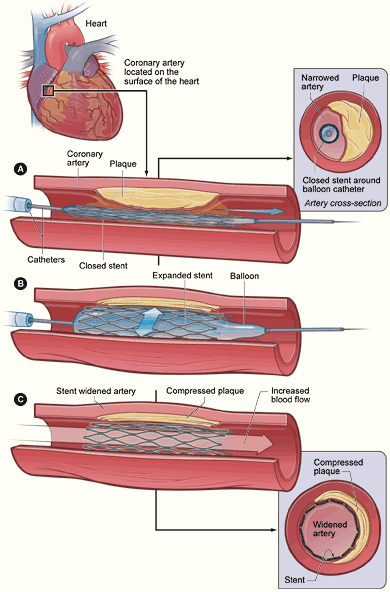
Stent placement. A, the catheter/DES device is inserted across the lesion. B, the balloon is inflated using saline fed through the catheter portion into the DES/Balloon component, expanding the DES and compressing it against the artery wall. C, the catheter and deflated balloon removed leaving the DES firmly embedded in the artery wall.

PCI is used to open a blocked coronary artery or arteries and to restore arterial blood flow to heart muscle, without requiring open-heart surgery. In patients with acute coronary syndromes, PCI may be appropriate; guidelines and best practices are constantly evolving. Heart attack 'onset to treatment time' is important and significantly influences clinical outcomes of PCI procedures. The rapid reperfusion of heart muscle is critical in preventing further heart muscle damage caused by heart attacks, this time is often referred to as 'Onset-to-Door' and 'Door-to-balloon' time, shortening this time is an important goal within an emergency care or hospital setting. A number of initiatives have been active sponsored by a variety of organizations and hospital groups since the late 1990s to reduce this time to treatment.

The use of PCI in addition to anti-angina medication in stable angina may reduce the number of patients with angina attacks for up to 3 years following the therapy, but does not reduce the risk of death, future myocardial infarction or need for other interventions.

== Adverse events ==
PCI is widely practiced and has a number of risks; however, major procedural complications are uncommon. PCI is performed using minimally invasive catheter-based procedures by an interventional cardiologist, a medical doctor with special training in the treatment of the heart.

For most patients who are not receiving primary PCI (not having PCI to treat a heart attack) the patient is usually awake during PCI, and chest discomfort may be experienced during the procedure. Bleeding from the insertion point in the groin (femoral artery) or wrist (radial artery) is common, in part due to the use of antiplatelet drugs. Some bruising is common, but occasionally a hematoma may form. This may delay hospital discharge as flow from the artery into the hematoma may continue (pseudoaneurysm) which requires surgical repair. Infection at the skin puncture site is rare and dissection (tearing) in the interior wall of an arterial blood vessel is uncommon. Allergic reaction to the contrast dye used is possible, but has been reduced with the newer agents. Deterioration of kidney function can occur in patients with pre-existing kidney disease, but kidney failure requiring dialysis is rare. Vascular access complications are less common and less serious when the procedure is performed via the radial artery.

The most serious risks are death, stroke, ventricular fibrillation (non-sustained ventricular tachycardia is common), myocardial infarction (heart attack, MI), and aortic dissection. A heart attack during or shortly after the procedure occurs in 0.3% of cases; this may require emergency coronary artery bypass surgery. Heart muscle injury characterized by elevated levels of CK-MB, troponin I, and troponin T may occur in up to 30% of all PCI procedures. Elevated enzymes have been associated with later clinical outcomes such as higher risk of death, subsequent MI, and need for repeat revascularization procedures. Angioplasty carried out shortly after an MI has a risk of causing a stroke, but this is less than the risk of a stroke following thrombolytic drug therapy.

As with any procedure involving the heart, complications can sometimes, though rarely, cause death. The mortality rate during angioplasty is 1.2%. Sometimes chest pain can occur during angioplasty because the balloon briefly blocks off the blood supply to the heart. The risk of complications is higher in:

- People aged 65 and older
- People who have kidney disease or diabetes
- Women
- People who have poor pumping function in their hearts
- People who have extensive heart disease and blockages

== Procedure ==
Balloon angioplasty is the inflation of a balloon (often part of an integrated medical device combining a balloon, guidewire, and stent) within the coronary artery to 'crush' the plaque causing the occlusion into the walls of the artery. Balloon angioplasty is still often performed as a part of PCI procedure, it is rarely the only activity performed. Procedures commonly associated with PCI are:

- Implantation of stents
- Arterial blockage debulking: removal or reshaping of plaque
  - Rotational, orbital, and/or laser atherectomy (cutting plaque out)
- Brachytherapy (use of radioactive source to inhibit restenosis)
- Coronary intravascular lithotripsy (IVL), or using sonic waves to break up calcified plaques

PCI consists of preparation of the skin area to be accessed (groin or arm), by shaving and swabbing the area with a bacteriostatic agent, usually a chlorhexidine based product. An introducer needle is inserted into the target artery. Once the access is gained, a "sheath introducer" is inserted to keep the artery open. This procedure is termed percutaneous access. As of 2023, catheter systems used in PCI procedures are often fully integrated medical devices. They are usually referred to as "over the wire" or OTW catheters. Typically having two lumen paths (a cavity within any tubular structure), the larger one for the navigating highly flexible guidewire and the smaller one for inflating and deflating the balloon or balloon/catheter assembly. The guidewire lumen extends the total length of the catheter. A balloon-stent is often part of the assembled device, other features may also be part of the medical device design depending on the nature of the procedure.

The interventional cardiologist uses the entry point created during the percutaneous access step, to introduce the catheter system and guides it to the occluded area of the coronary artery being treated, using fluoroscopy and radiopaque dyes as an imaging tool. The device and its balloon/stent components can be inflated to open the stenotic diseased artery area. When a stent is used, the stent tube mesh is initially collapsed onto the balloon component of the catheter. In this collapsed state, it is small enough to be passed through relatively narrow peripheral arteries and then inflated by the underlying balloon and pressed firmly against the diseased coronary artery wall. It is expanded by pressure introduced by injecting physiological saline into the device through the lumen of the still attached catheter. Inflation time and pressure used are recorded during this placement procedure. After the balloon inflation/deflation or the deposition of the stent, the placement device/deflated balloon are removed leaving the stent in place.

The interventional cardiologist decides how to treat the blockage in the best way during the PCI/stent placement, based on real-time data. The cardiologist uses imaging data provided by both intravascular ultrasound (IVUS), and fluoroscopic imaging (combined with a radiopaque dye) during the procedure. The information obtained from these two sources enables the cardiologist to track the path of the catheter-device as it moves through the arterial vessels. This information also helps determine both the location and physical characteristics of plaque(s) causing narrowing in the arteries. Data from these two techniques is used to correctly position the stent and to obtain detailed information relating to the coronary arterial anatomy. This anatomy varies greatly among individuals, having this information becomes crucial for effective treatment. The obtained data is recorded on video and is of value in cases when future treatment is needed.

=== Types of stent ===
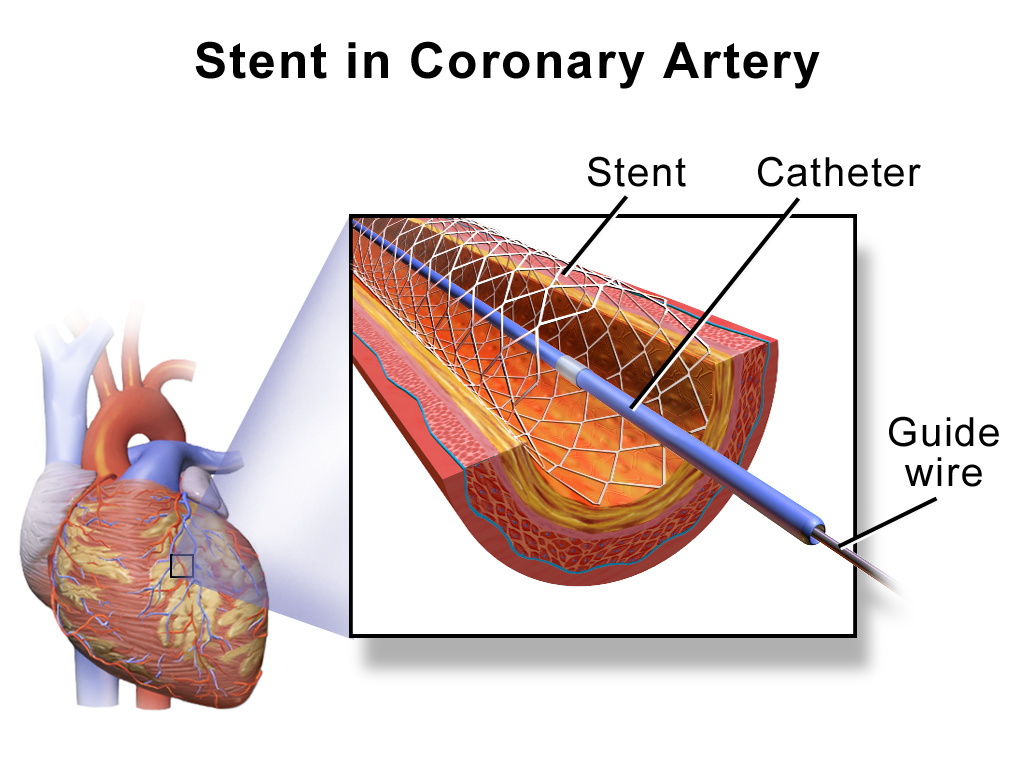
A coronary stent placed by percutaneous coronary intervention.

Older bare-metal stents (BMS) provide a mechanical framework that holds the artery wall open, preventing stenosis, or narrowing, of coronary arteries. Newer drug-eluting stents (DES) are traditional stents with a polymer coating containing drugs that prevent cell proliferation. The antiproliferative drugs are released slowly over time to help prevent tissue growth.

DES stents have been shown to help prevent restenosis of the artery through mechanisms that rely upon the suppression of tissue growth at the stent site and local modulation of the body's inflammatory and immune responses. The first two drug-eluting stents to be utilized were the paclitaxel-eluting stent and the sirolimus-eluting stent, both of which have received approval from the U.S. Food and Drug Administration. Most current FDA-approved drug-eluting stents use sirolimus (also known as rapamycin), everolimus and zotarolimus. Biolimus A9-eluting stents, which utilize biodegradable polymers, are approved outside the U.S.

Newer-generation PCI technologies aim to reduce the risk of late stent thrombosis or other long-term adverse events. Some DES products market a biodegradable polymer coating with the belief that the permanent polymer coatings of DES contribute to long-term inflammation. Other strategies: A more recent study proposes that in the case of population with diabetes mellitus—a population particularly at risk—a treatment with paclitaxel-eluting balloon followed by BMS may reduce the incidence of coronary restenosis or myocardial infarction compared with BMS administered alone.

After placement of a stent or scaffold, the patient needs to take two antiplatelet medications (aspirin and one of a few other options) for several months to help prevent blood clots. The length of time a patient needs to be on dual antiplatelet therapy is individualized based risks of ischemic events and bleeding risk.

=== Thrombus aspiration ===
In primary PCI, angiography may demonstrate thrombus (blood clots) inside the coronary arteries. Various studies have been performed to determine whether aspirating these clots (thrombus aspiration or manual thrombectomy) is beneficial. At the moment there is no evidence that routine clot aspiration improves outcomes.

=== Complex lesions ===
Lesions with a high degree of calcium deposition within the vessel wall, especially if the calcium is circumferential, are considered to be hard to dilate in regards to balloon angioplasty. Complex lesions are one of the key predictors of poor outcome in percutaneous coronary intervention (PCI), hence calcium lesion modification is needed before implantations of stents. The aim is to create cracks in the calcium within the vessel wall in order to increase the likelihood of successful expansion of the stenosis and delivery of the final stent. This is traditionally achieved by balloon angioplasty or debulking strategies including rotational, orbital and laser atherectomy. However, coronary intravascular lithotripsy using acoustic shockwaves is a novel approach for treating superficial and deep calcium in the vessel wall.

== Recovery and rehabilitation ==
For many patients the stenting procedures does not require an in-hospital stay. Much of the time spent in immediate recovery post-stenting is to ensure the access site is not bleeding. The patient is generally monitored using ECG etc. Medications to prevent blood clots from forming generally and in the stent are given directly after the stenting procedure, commonly in the form of an immediate loading dose of the potent anticoagulant (blood thinner) Plavix administered as a tablet. Other anticoagulant medicines are also used and the combination of aspirin and Plavix is a typical anticoagulant practice. For patients who have had a heart attack, the length of hospitalization is largely dependent on the muscle damage caused by the event.

If a stent has been placed as part of the PCI procedure, the patient will be given a 'medical device card' (US) with information about the implanted stent such as a medical device serial number, this is important as it informs clinicians performing future potential medical procedures, this is also the case with arterial closure systems which are also medical devices.

There is usually significant soreness at the point of entry into the arterial system, and fairly large hematomas (significant bruising) are very common, this soreness usually improves after a week or so. Patients are generally advised to 'take it easy' for a week or two and are instructed to be cautious not to lift any substantial weight, this is primarily to ensure the access site heals. Follow up appointments within a week or two of the procedure with a cardiologist or primary care provider/GP are a standard global practice.

It is a standard practice to have further follow-up examinations every three to six months for the first year, though these practices do vary by region and practitioners. Further diagnostic coronary angiography is not routinely indicated after coronary stent implantation. If progression of heart disease is suspected, a stress test will be performed; patients who develop symptoms or show evidence of ischemia in a stress test may undergo diagnostic cardiac re-catheterization.

Physical examinations play an important role after PCI-stenting procedures. Those patients at high risk of suffering from complications and those with more complexed coronary issues, angiography may be indicated regardless of the findings of non-invasive stress tests.

Cardiac rehabilitation activities are dependent on many factors, but largely are connected to the degree of heart muscle damage prior to the PCI/DES procedure. Many patients who undergo this procedure have not had a heart attack, and may have no notable damage to their hearts. Others may have had a serious heart attack and the amount of damage to their heart's ability to supply the body with oxygenated blood might be impaired. Rehabilitation activities are prescribed to fit each individual's needs.

== Usage ==
Percutaneous coronary angioplasty is one of the most common procedures performed during U.S. hospital stays; it accounted for 3.6% of all operating room procedures performed in 2011. Between 2001 and 2011, however, its volume decreased by 28%, from 773,900 operating procedures performed in 2001 to 560,500 procedures in 2011.

=== Comparison to CABG ===
Conflicting data exists relating to clinical outcomes comparing PCI/Stenting and CABG surgery. The preponderance of studies do suggest that CABG offers advantages in reducing death and myocardial infarction in people with multivessel blockages compared with PCI. The assessments are complicated by considerations such as the fact that PCI is a minimally invasive procedure and CABG is significant surgery. Different modeling studies have come to opposing conclusions on the relative cost-effectiveness of PCI and CABG in people with myocardial ischemia that does not improve with medical treatment.

== History ==
Coronary angioplasty, also known as percutaneous transluminal coronary angioplasty (PTCA), because it is done through the skin and through the lumen of the artery, was first developed in 1977 by Andreas Gruentzig. The first procedure took place Friday Sept 16, 1977, at Zurich, Switzerland. Adoption of the procedure accelerated subsequent to Gruentzig's move to Emory University in the United States. Gruentzig's first fellow at Emory was Merril Knudtson, who, by 1981, had already introduced it to Calgary, Alberta, Canada. By the mid-1980s, many leading medical centers throughout the world were adopting the procedure as a treatment for coronary artery disease.

== Research ==
Current concepts recognize that after three months the artery has adapted and healed and no longer needs the stent. Complete revascularization of all stenosed coronary arteries after a STEMI is more efficacious in terms of major adverse cardiac events and all-cause mortality, while being safer than culprit-vessel-only approach.

== Controversy ==
In 2007 the New England Journal of Medicine published the results of a trial called COURAGE. The study compared stenting as used in PCI to medical therapy alone in symptomatic stable coronary artery disease (CAD). This showed there was no mortality advantage to stenting in stable CAD, though there was earlier relief of symptoms which equalized by five years. After this trial there were widely publicized reports of individual doctors performing PCI in patients who did not meet any traditional criteria. A 2014 meta-analysis showed there may be improved mortality with second generation drug-eluting stents, which were not available during the COURAGE trial. Medical societies have since issued guidelines as to when it is appropriate to perform percutaneous coronary intervention. In response the rate of inappropriate stenting was seen to have declined between 2009 and 2014. Statistics published related to the trends in U.S. hospital procedures, showed a 28% decrease in the overall number of PCIs performed in the period from 2001 to 2011, with the largest decrease notable from 2007.

The 2017 ORBITA study has also caused much controversy, in that it found that following percutaneous coronary intervention there was no statistically significant difference in exercise time compared with medical therapy. The study authors believe that angina relief by PCI is largely a placebo effect. Others have noted the small sample size with insufficient power to detect outcome differences and the short 6 week duration of the trial. 85% of patients in the medical therapy arm elected to have PCI at the end of the trial.

The 2019 ISCHEMIA trial has confirmed that invasive procedures (PCI or CABG) do not reduce death or heart attacks compared to medical therapy alone for stable angina. Patients with angina experienced improved quality of life with PCI compared to medical therapy.
