= Charles Theodore Dotter =

American physician and pioneer radiologist (1920–1985)

Charles Dotter
- Born: Charles Theodore Dotter; June 14, 1920; Boston, U.S.
- Died: February 15, 1985 (aged 64); Oregon, U.S.
- Education: Duke University B.A., Cornell University M.D.
- Known for: interventional radiology
- Scientific career
- Fields: vascular radiology

Charles Theodore Dotter (14 June 1920 – 15 February 1985) was a pioneering American radiologist who is credited with developing interventional radiology. Dotter, with his trainee Dr Melvin P. Judkins, described angioplasty in 1964.

Dotter received a bachelor of arts degree in 1941 from Duke University. He went to medical school at Cornell, where he met his future wife, Pamela Beattie, a head nurse at New York Hospital. They married in 1944. He completed his internship at the United States Naval Hospital in New York State, and his residency at New York Hospital.

Dotter invented angioplasty and the catheter-delivered stent, which were first used to treat peripheral arterial disease. It was Dotter who, in 1950, developed an automatic X-Ray Roll-Film magazine capable of producing images at the rate of 2 per second. On January 16, 1964, at Oregon Health and Science University Dotter percutaneously dilated a tight, localized stenosis of the superficial femoral artery (SFA) in an 82-year-old woman with painful leg ischemia and gangrene who refused leg amputation. After successful dilation of the stenosis with a guide wire and coaxial Teflon catheters, the circulation returned to her leg. The dilated artery stayed open until her death from pneumonia two and a half years later. He also developed liver biopsy through the jugular vein, initially in animal models and in 1973 in humans.

Charles Dotter is commonly known as the "Father of Interventional Radiology." He served as the chairman of the School of Medicine Department of Diagnostic Radiology at Oregon Health Sciences University for 33 years, from 1952 until his death in 1985. The University now boasts the Dotter Interventional Institute in his honor.

== See also ==
- Interventional Radiology
