= Restenosis =

Recurrence of stenosis, a narrowing of a blood vessel

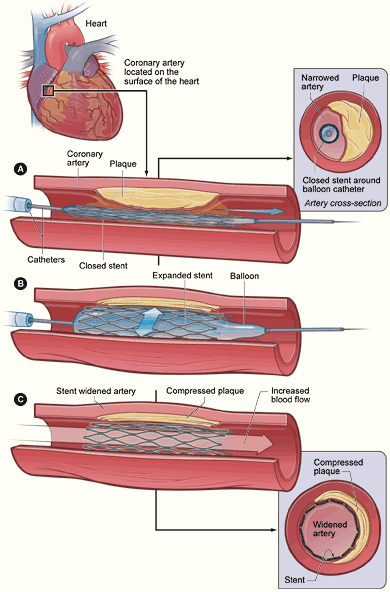
The phenomenon of vessel restenosis, an immune response to damaged tissue, is known to be a common adverse event and the Achilles heel of angioplasty and stenting. Reducing restenosis is one of the highest priorities in research and the development of new endovascular technologies. Restenosis rates of drug-eluting stents appear to be significantly lower than bare-metal stents, and research is underway to determine if drug-coated balloons also improve restenosis outcomes.

Restenosis is the recurrence of stenosis, a narrowing of a blood vessel, leading to restricted blood flow. Restenosis usually pertains to an artery or other large blood vessel that has become narrowed, received treatment to clear the blockage, and subsequently become re-narrowed. This is usually restenosis of an artery, or other blood vessel, or possibly a vessel within an organ.

Restenosis is a common adverse event of endovascular procedures. Procedures frequently used to treat vascular damage from atherosclerosis and related narrowing and re-narrowing (restenosis) of blood vessels include vascular surgery, cardiac surgery, and angioplasty.

When a stent is used and restenosis occurs, this is called in-stent restenosis or ISR. If it occurs following balloon angioplasty, this is called post-angioplasty restenosis or PARS. The diagnostic threshold for restenosis in both ISR and PARS is ≥50% stenosis.

If restenosis occurs after a procedure, follow-up imaging is not the only way to initially detect compromised blood flow. Symptoms may also suggest or signal restenosis, but this should be confirmed by imaging. For instance, a coronary stent patient who develops restenosis may experience recurrent chest pain (angina) or have a minor or major heart attack (myocardial infarction), though they may not report it. This is why it is important that a patient comply with follow-up screenings and the clinician follows through with a thorough clinical assessment. But it is also important to note that not all cases of restenosis lead to clinical symptoms, nor are they asymptomatic.

== Causes ==
Surgery to widen or unblock a blood vessel usually has a long-lasting beneficial effect on the patient. However, in some cases, the procedure itself can cause further narrowing of the vessel, or restenosis. Angioplasty, also called percutaneous transluminal coronary angioplasty (PTCA), is commonly used to treat blockages of the coronary or peripheral arteries (such as in the limbs). The balloon inserted into the narrowing 'smashes' the cholesterol plaques (atherosclerosis) against the artery walls, thus widening the size of the lumen and increasing blood flow. However the action damages the artery walls, and they respond by using physiological mechanisms to repair the damage. (See physiology below.)

A stent is a mesh, tube-like structure often used in conjunction with angioplasty to permanently hold open an artery, allowing for unrestricted blood flow, or to support a weakness in the artery wall called an aneurysm. The artery can react to the stent, perceive it as a foreign body, and respond by mounting an immune system response which leads to further narrowing near or inside the stent.

== Physiology ==
Damage to the blood vessel wall by angioplasty triggers a physiological response that can be divided into two stages. The first stage that occurs immediately after tissue trauma, is thrombosis. A blood clot forms at the site of damage and further hinders blood flow. This is accompanied by an inflammatory immune response.

The second stage tends to occur 3–6 months after surgery and is the result of the proliferation of cells in the media, a smooth muscle wall in the vessel. This is also known as Neointimal Hyperplasia (NIHA).

== Diagnosis ==
=== Imaging ===
Vessel restenosis is typically detected by angiography, but can also be detected by duplex ultrasound and other imaging techniques.

=== As "late loss" ===
Conceptual schematic illustrating effectiveness of endovascular interventions on lumen diameter to improve blood flow as represented by acute gain, late loss (restenosis), and net gain.

Late loss is synonymous with restenosis and means loss of the lumen after a procedure intended to open the vessel. It measures either the percent (relative) or absolute change in minimum luminal diameter (MLD) over the months following a vascular procedure, such as the implantation of a stent graft. Late loss is one metric that is useful in determining the effectiveness of vascular interventions in clinical trials for either an individual patient or a group of patients.

However late loss is only part of the terminology in describing the outcomes of vascular interventions. For instance, the implantation of a stent graft will first provide an acute gain in lumen diameter. In other words, there is an immediate gain in lumen size because the implanted stent opens up the vessel. However, over time, the body's inflammatory immune response (described below in the "Causes" section) reacts to the stent graft via smooth muscle proliferation, etc., which pushes the stent graft back, narrowing the vessel and losing at least a percentage of what was previously gained, or late loss.

The net gain of lumen diameter is the difference between acute gain and late loss and is a measure of stent-graft effectiveness.

=== Percent diameter restenosis ===
Percent diameter restenosis (or just percent diameter stenosis) is a measure observed in individual patients and is typically calculated as the difference between the minimal (or minimum) luminal diameter (MLD) from the target reference vessel diameter (RVD), divided by the RVD, and multiplied by 100 to get the percentage of stenosis. It is an important measure needed to calculate binary restenosis (see Binary Restenosis section below). The RVD is typically calculated by averaging the MLD of the healthy part of the vessel both proximal and distal to the vessel lesion.

There is some controversy over the accuracy of observing the lesion MLD itself, since many atherosclerotic lesions may create uneven "hills and valleys" within the lumen, making a true MLD difficult to obtain or estimate. Some research indicates calculating "area stenosis" is also a valid measure of actual vessel stenosis compared to diameter stenosis alone, but this requires additional analysis because a tracing of the lumen border must be performed. However, there are computer programs available to automatically perform this function. It may be helpful to obtain both percent diameter and area percent stenosis, especially since the two percentages may not always correlate with each other.

An occlusion, or the blocking of all blood flow through a vessel, is considered 100% percent diameter stenosis.

=== Binary restenosis ===
Binary restenosis is traditionally defined as a reduction in the percent diameter stenosis of 50% or more (≥50%). It is also known as just "binary stenosis". The term "binary" means that patients are placed in 2 groups, those who have ≥50% stenosis and those who have <50% stenosis. Binary restenosis is an epidemiological method of analyzing percent diameter stenosis for observing not only an individual patient, but also performing statistical techniques on a group of patients to determine averages (descriptive measures of central tendency) or as a predictive variable.

== Prevention ==
In the first stage of restenosis, administering anti-platelet drugs (called IIb/IIIa inhibitors) immediately after surgery greatly reduces the chance of a thrombosis occurring.

Drug-eluting stents, coated with pharmaceuticals that inhibit tissue growth and thus reduce the risk of restenosis from scar tissue and cell proliferation, are now widely used. These stents reduce the occurrence of restenosis, with clinical studies showing an incidence rate of 5% or lower.

== Treatment ==
If restenosis occurs without a stent, it is usually treated with more angioplasty. This treatment is also used if restenosis occurs at either the proximal or distal end of the stent.

If restenosis occurs within a stent (also known as in-stent stenosis), it may be treated with repeated angioplasty and insertion of another stent inside the original, often with a drug-eluting stent.

Over the past 5 years, ISR has been increasingly treated with a drug-coated balloon (DCB), which is a balloon coated with the same anti-cancer drugs that prevent restenosis, such as Paclitaxel. The balloon avoids the need for a double layer of metal which is used when an in-stent restenosis is treated with another stent within the original stent. Additionally, DCB treatment does not leave an implant in the body and is designed for faster drug delivery.

Alternative treatments include brachytherapy, or intracoronary radiation. The radiation kills cells and inhibits tissue growth (similar to a patient undergoing cancer therapy).

== Incidence ==
Rates of restenosis differ between devices (e.g., stent-grafts, balloon angioplasty, etc.) and location of procedure (i.e., centrally located in the heart, such as the coronary artery, or in peripheral vessels such as the popliteal artery in the leg, the pudendal artery in the pelvis, or the carotid artery in the neck).

=== Rates in cardiac procedures ===
In cardiac procedures, balloon angioplasty without stent implantation has been associated with a high incidence of restenosis, with rates ranging from 25% to 50%, and the majority of these patients need further angioplasty within 6 months.

A 2010 study in India comparing coronary drug-eluting stents (DES) with coronary bare-metal stents (BMS) reported that restenosis developed in 23.1% of DES patients vs 48.8% in BMS patients, and female sex was found to be a statistically significant risk factor for developing restenosis.

However, in newer-generation DES and BMS the restenosis rates are much lower. For example, the NORSTENT trial, presented in 2016, reports target-lesion revascularization rates of 5.3% and 10.3% for DES and BMS respectively.

=== Rates in peripheral procedures ===
In peripheral procedures, rates are still high. A 2003 study of selective and systematic stenting for limb-threatening ischemia reported restenosis rates at 1year follow-up in 32.3% of selective stenting patients and 34.7% of systematic stenting patients.

The 2006 SIROCCO trial compared the sirolimus drug-eluting stent with a bare nitinol stent for atherosclerotic lesions of the subsartorial artery, reporting restenosis at 2 year follow-up was 22.9% and 21.1%, respectively.

A 2009 study compared bare nitinol stents with percutaneous transluminal angioplasty (PTA) in subsartorial artery disease. At 1 year follow-up, restenosis was reported in 34.4% of stented patients versus 61.1% of PTA patients.

== See also ==
- Angioplasty
- Drug-eluting stent
- Neointimal hyperplasia
- Stent
- Images of restenosis with bare-metal stents and drug-eluting stents are here .
