= Eugeny Kenig =

Russian-German scientist

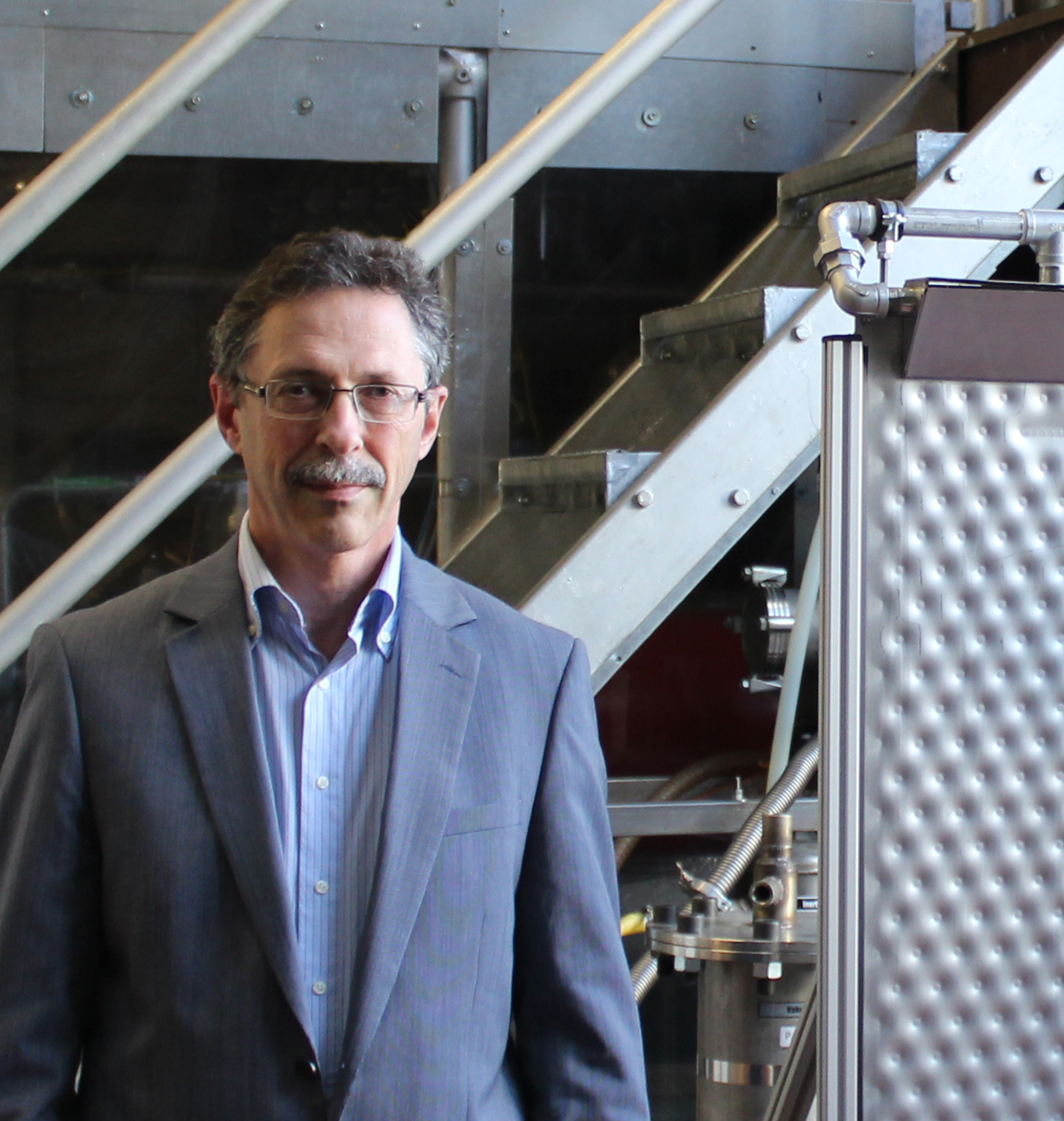
Eugeny Kenig

Eugeny Kenig (born 25 April 1957 in Moscow, Russia) is a Russian-German scientist and head of the chair of Fluid Process Engineering at the Department of Mechanical Engineering at University of Paderborn.

== Career ==
Eugeny Kenig attended a primary school in Moscow from 1964 to 1966. He obtained the matriculation standard at the Gymnasium No. 625 in 1974. In the same year, he began his studies of applied mathematics at the Gubkin University of Oil and Gas in Moscow, Russia. Five years later, he graduated with honours. Subsequently, he worked as a research assistant at the Russian Academy of Sciences at the Kurnakow Institute for General and Inorganic Chemistry in Moscow from 1979 to 1994. In 1985, he earned his doctorate with his work on heat and mass transfer in rectification and absorption processes of two- and multi-component mixtures. After 1994, Kenig received an Alexander von Humboldt scholarship for one year and worked as a guest scientist at the Chair of Thermal Process Engineering at the University of Dortmund. He stayed employed at the chair as a research associate for three more years until 1998. In 1998, Eugeny Kenig worked as a development engineer at BASF in Ludwigshafen, Germany. Afterwards, he was a research associate at the University of Essen until 2000. Eugeny Kenig habilitated at the Department of Chemical Engineering at the University of Dortmund with his work entitled "Modelling of Multicomponent Mass Transfer in Separation of Fluid Mixtures" and attained the licence to teach "Fluid Process Engineering". From 2000 to 2006 he worked as a lecturer for thermal processing technology at the University of Dortmund. In 2006 he was awarded the title "adjunct Professor". On 1 July 2008 he became the head of the Chair of Fluid Process Engineering at Paderborn University, where he is still working today. Since 2010 he also is adjunct Professor at the Gubkin University of Oil and Gas.

Kenig developed an approach called "hydrodynamic analogies" for the modelling of thermal separators. Its idea is to represent complex hydrodynamics by a combination of simple flow patterns. This approach is part of the concept of complementary modelling, which was also conceived by Kenig.

In the context of his research activities, he is involved in kinetic modelling of various processes and phenomena, reactive separation methods, computational fluid dynamics, micro-separation processes and process-related energy efficiency problems. Kenig is one of the founders of the Kompetenzzentrum für nachhaltige Energietechnik (KET) at Paderborn University. He is currently chairman of the KET board of management.

== Honours ==
- Since 2008: Head of the chair of "Fluid Process Engineering", Universität Paderborn

== Monographs and book chapters ==
- Kenig, E.Y. and Blagov, S. Modeling of Distillation Processes, In: Distillation: Fundamentals and Principles (Eds. A. Górak & E. Sorensen), London a.o.: Elsevier, 2014
- Kenig, E.Y. A Framework for the Modeling of Reactive Separations, In: Process Systems Engineering: Vol. 7 Dynamic Process Modeling (Eds. J. R. Banga, M. C. Georgiadis & E. N. Pistikopoulos), Weinheim: Wiley-VCH, 2010
- Kenig, E.Y. and Górak, A. Modeling of Reactive Distillation, In: Modeling of Process Intensification (Ed. F. Keil), Weinheim: Wiley-VCH, 2007
- Richter, Joachim; Górak, Andrzej; Kenig, Eugeny Y (2006). "Catalytic distillation". Integrated Reaction and Separation Operations. pp. 95–147. doi:10.1007/3-540-30304-9_3. ISBN 978-3-540-30148-6.
- Kenig, E.Y. and Górak, A. Reactive Absorption, In: Integrated Chemical Processes (Eds. K. Sundmacher, A. Kienle & A. Seidel-Morgenstern), Weinheim: Wiley-VCH, 2005

== Surveys ==
- Kenig, Eugeny Y.; Su, Yuanhai; Lautenschleger, Anna; Chasanis, Paris; Grünewald, Marcus (2013). "Micro-separation of fluid systems: A state-of-the-art review". Separation and Purification Technology. 120: 245–64. doi:10.1016/j.seppur.2013.09.028.
- Yildirim, Ömer; Kiss, Anton A.; Hüser, Nicole; Leßmann, Katharina; Kenig, Eugeny Y. (2012). "Reactive absorption in chemical process industry: A review on current activities". Chemical Engineering Journal. 213: 371–91. doi:10.1016/j.cej.2012.09.121.
- Yildirim, Ömer; Kiss, Anton A.; Kenig, Eugeny Y. (2011). "Dividing wall columns in chemical process industry: A review on current activities". Separation and Purification Technology. 80 (3): 403–17. doi:10.1016/j.seppur.2011.05.009.
- Vaidya, P. D.; Kenig, E. Y. (2010). "Termolecular Kinetic Model for CO_{2}-Alkanolamine Reactions: An Overview". Chemical Engineering & Technology. 33 (10): 1577–81. doi:10.1002/ceat.201000050.
- Chasanis, P.; Kern, J.; Grünewald, M.; Kenig, E. Y. (2010). "Mikrotrenntechnik: Entwicklungsstand und Perspektiven" [Micro separation technology: development and perspectives]. Chemie Ingenieur Technik (in German). 82 (3): 215–28. doi:10.1002/cite.200900154.
- Vaidya, Prakash D.; Kenig, Eugeny Y. (2009). "Kinetics of carbonyl sulfide reaction with alkanolamines: A review". Chemical Engineering Journal. 148 (2–3): 207–11. doi:10.1016/j.cej.2008.08.009.
- Kenig, E. Y (2007). "Advanced Modeling of Reactive Separation Units with Structured Packings". Chemical Product and Process Modeling. 2. doi:10.2202/1934-2659.1042. S2CID 95105134.
- Vaidya, P. D.; Kenig, E. Y. (2007). "CO_{2}-Alkanolamine Reaction Kinetics: A Review of Recent Studies". Chemical Engineering & Technology. 30 (11): 1467–74. doi:10.1002/ceat.200700268.
- Vaidya, Prakash D.; Kenig, Eugeny Y. (2007). "Gas–Liquid Reaction Kinetics: A Review of Determination Methods". Chemical Engineering Communications. 194 (12): 1543–65. doi:10.1080/00986440701518314. S2CID 97730475.
