= Stefan Aust =

German journalist (born 1946)

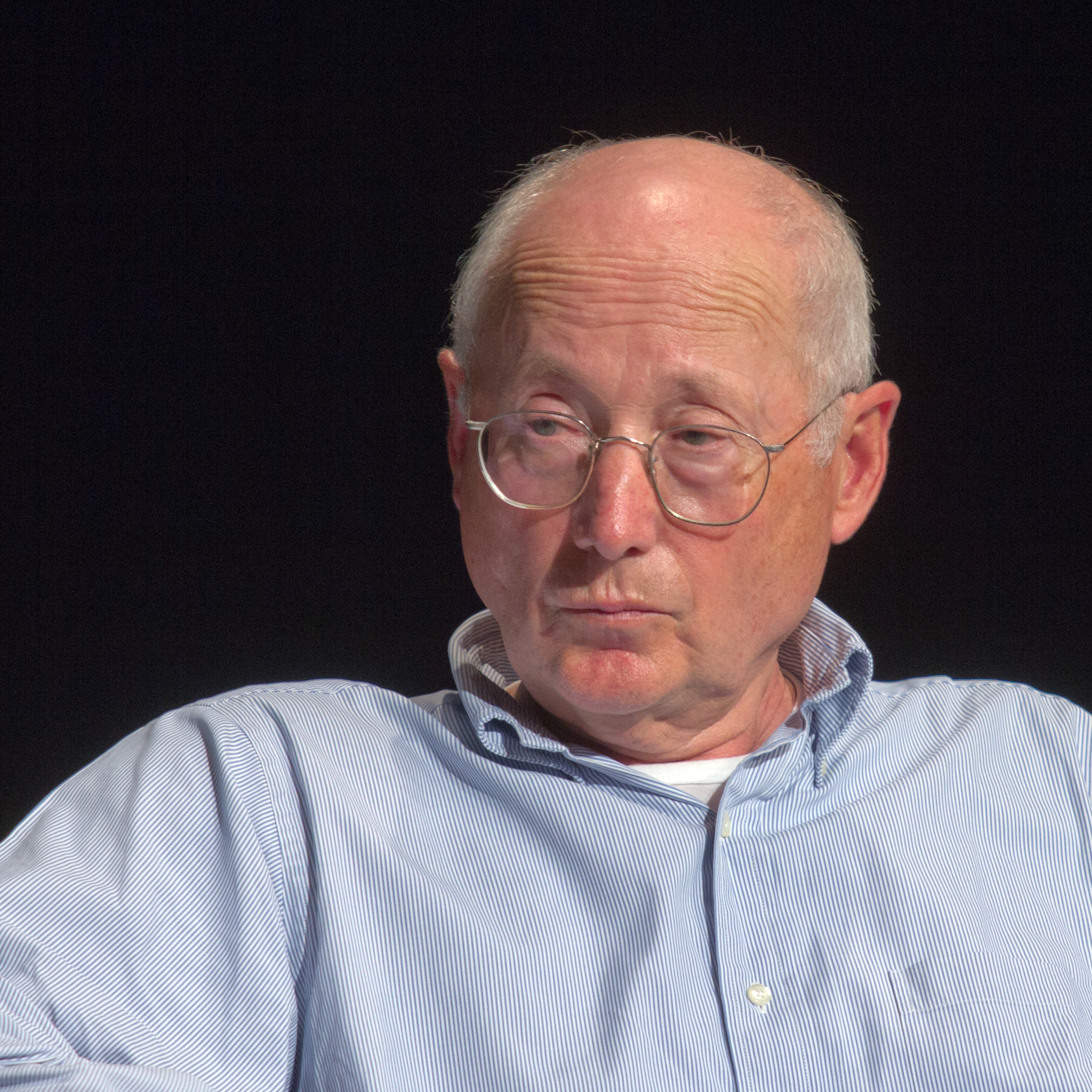
- Aust in 2014
- Born: 1 July 1946 (age 80); Stade, Germany
- Occupation: Journalist
- Known for: Editor-in-chief of Der Spiegel (1994–2008); Publisher of Die Welt (2014–2024)

Stefan Aust (German: [ˈʃtɛ.fan aʊ̯st]; born 1 July 1946) is a German journalist. He was the editor-in-chief of the weekly news magazine Der Spiegel from 1994 to February 2008 and was the publisher of the conservative leading Die Welt newspaper from 2014 to 2024 and the paper's editor until December 2016.

== Early life and education ==
Aust was born in Stade, Lower Saxony as son of the farmer Reinhard Aust and his wife Ilse, born Hartig. Together with four siblings he grew up on a small dairy farm which his family ran until the early 1960s. His father immigrated to America at the age of 18 and returned to Germany in the summer of 1939. His grandfather was a merchant and shipowner.

Aust graduated from high school at the Athenaeum in Stade and gained his first journalistic experience working for the local school newspaper Wir, through which he also got to know the journalist Henryk M. Broder. Aust dropped out of business studies after a few weeks.

== Career ==
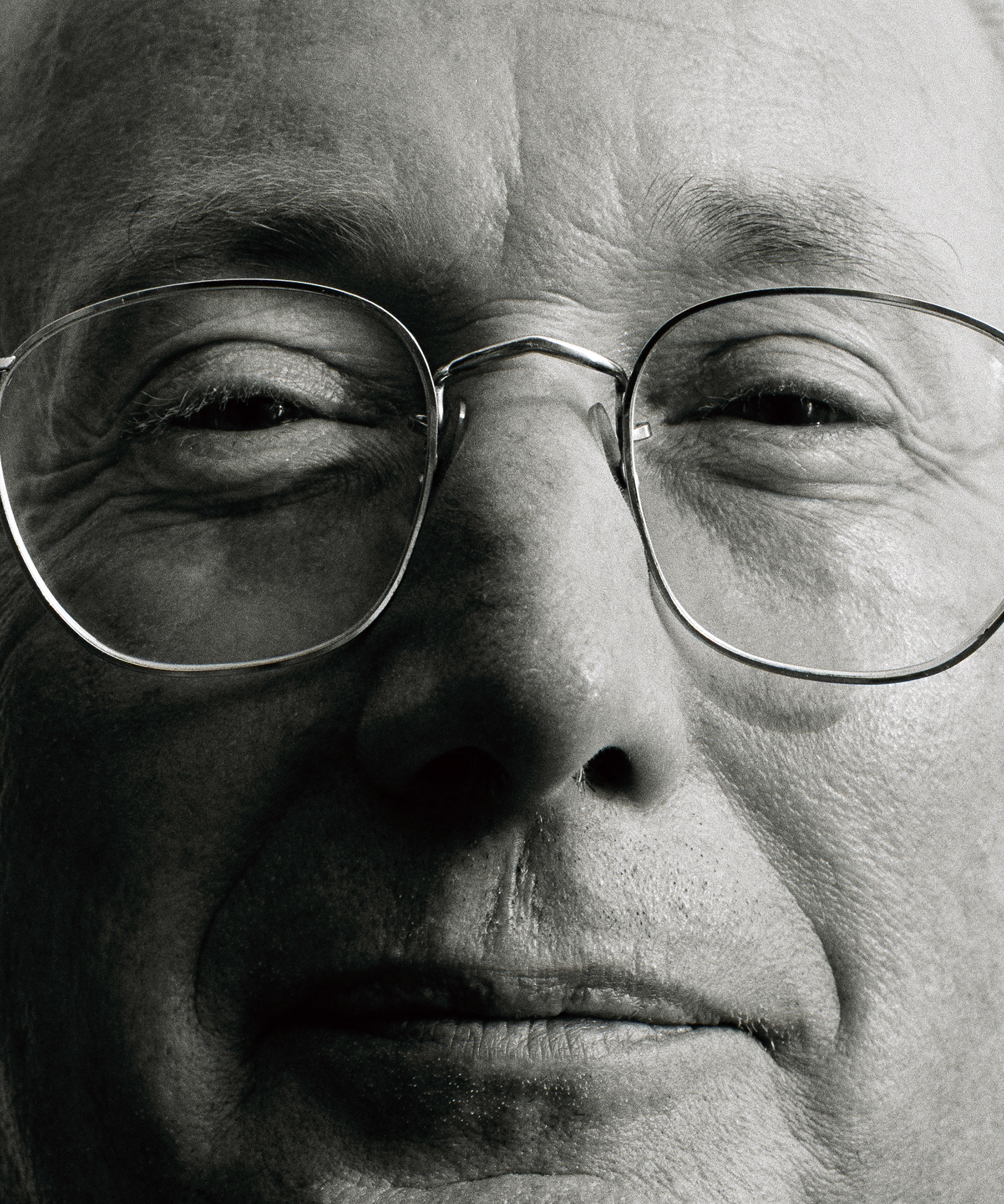
Stefan Aust photographed by Oliver Mark, Hamburg 2005

=== Early career ===
Via Wolfgang Röhl, Klaus Rainer Röhl's younger brother, whom he met at the school newspaper, Aust came to the magazine konkret after graduating from high school, where he was initially in charge of the magazines layout. From 1966 to 1969 Aust then worked as an editor for konkret and later for the St. Pauli-Nachrichten. In 1969, Aust traveled to the United States for half a year.

From 1970 he worked for the Norddeutscher Rundfunk. He was a television journalist at NDR and worked for the political television magazine "Panorama" from 1972 to 1987.

Since 1987 Aust built the new "Spiegel TV" on behalf of Rudolf Augstein. Later, despite strong resistance from the Spiegel editorial team, he also took over the mother ship, Der Spiegel. He was its editor-in-chief from 1994 to February 2008.

From 2014 to 2024, he has been the publisher of the conservative newspaper Die Welt. Until December 2016, he was also the paper's editor.

Two of Aust's books have been made into films: Der Pirat 1997 by Bernd Schadewald and The Baader Meinhof Complex 2008 by Uli Edel.

== Views and reception ==
Aust has repeatedly expressed scepticism about the causes and consequences of global warming and dismissal of measures against climate change and of proponents of such measures.

Former Spiegel editor Oliver Gehrs wrote about Aust's influence on Spiegel in his 2005 book The Spiegel-Complex. In it he argues that Aust was never "left-wing" - he acted on the left for decades, but probably never thought so. Aust is an anti-intellectual who is not attracted by the political debate, but by the noise. "It wasn't the political debate that appealed to him, but the action."

In 2014, Aust became editor of the newspaper Welt, which was published by Springer Verlag, which he fought against for decades. Aust was a longtime defender of the former Spiegel editor Matthias Matussek, who also switched to Welt in 2013 but got fired in 2015 as he was drifting to the New Right and its German movement Neue Rechte.

== Books ==
- Kennwort 100 Blumen – Verwicklung des Verfassungsschutzes in den Mordfall Ulrich Schmücker. Konkret Literatur Verlag, Hamburg 1980. ISBN 3-922144-04-7
- Hausbesetzer: Wofür sie kämpfen, wie sie leben und wie sie leben wollen. Hoffmann und Campe, Hamburg 1981. ISBN 3-455-08765-5 (with Sabine Rosenbladt)
- Brokdorf: Symbol einer politischen Wende. Hoffmann und Campe, Hamburg 1981. ISBN 3-455-08782-5
- Der Baader Meinhof Komplex. Hoffmann und Campe, Hamburg 1985. ISBN 3-455-08253-X (expanded: 1997, ISBN 3-455-11230-7; paperback 1998, ISBN 3-442-12953-2; revised edition 2008, ISBN 978-3-455-50029-5)
- Werner Mauss – ein deutscher Agent. Hoffmann und Campe, Hamburg 1988. ISBN 3-455-08641-1 (revised 1999, ISBN 3-442-12957-5)
- Der Pirat: Die Drogenkarriere des Jan C.. Hoffmann und Campe, Hamburg 1990. ISBN 3-455-08367-6 (papareback 2000, ISBN 3-442-15046-9)
- Die Flucht: Über die Vertreibung der Deutschen aus dem Osten. Spiegel-Buchverlag, Hamburg 2002. ISBN 3-421-05682-X
- Der Lockvogel: Die tödliche Geschichte eines V-Mannes zwischen Verfassungsschutz und Terrorismus. Rowohlt, Reinbek 2002. ISBN 3-498-00063-2 (paperback 2003, ISBN 3-499-61638-6)
- 11. September. Geschichte eines Terrorangriffs. DVA, Stuttgart 2002. ISBN 3-421-05656-0 (with Cordt Schnibben)
- Irak: Geschichte eines modernen Krieges. Spiegel-Buchverlag, Hamburg 2003. ISBN 3-421-05804-0 (edited with Cordt Schnibben)
- Die Gegenwart der Vergangenheit: Der lange Schatten des Dritten Reichs. DVA, München 2004. ISBN 3-421-05754-0 (edited with Gerhard Spörl)
- Der Fall Deutschland: Abstieg eines Superstars. Piper, München 2005. ISBN 3-492-04831-5 (with Claus Richter, Gabor Steingart, Matthias Ziemann)
- Wettlauf um die Welt: Die Globalisierung und wir. Piper, München 2007. ISBN 978-3-492-05032-6 (with Claus Richter, Matthias Ziemann)
- Hitler's erster Feind: Der Kampf des Konrad Heiden. Rowohlt, Berlin 2016. ISBN 3-498-00090-X
- Xi Jinping. Der mächtigste Mann der Welt. Piper, München-Berlin, 2021 ISBN 978-3-492-07006-5

== Awards and recognitions ==
In 2010 Aust was awarded the Mercator Visiting Professorship for Political Management at the University of Duisburg-Essen's NRW School of Governance. He gave seminars and lectures at the university.
