= Das Goldene Lenkrad =

German automotive award

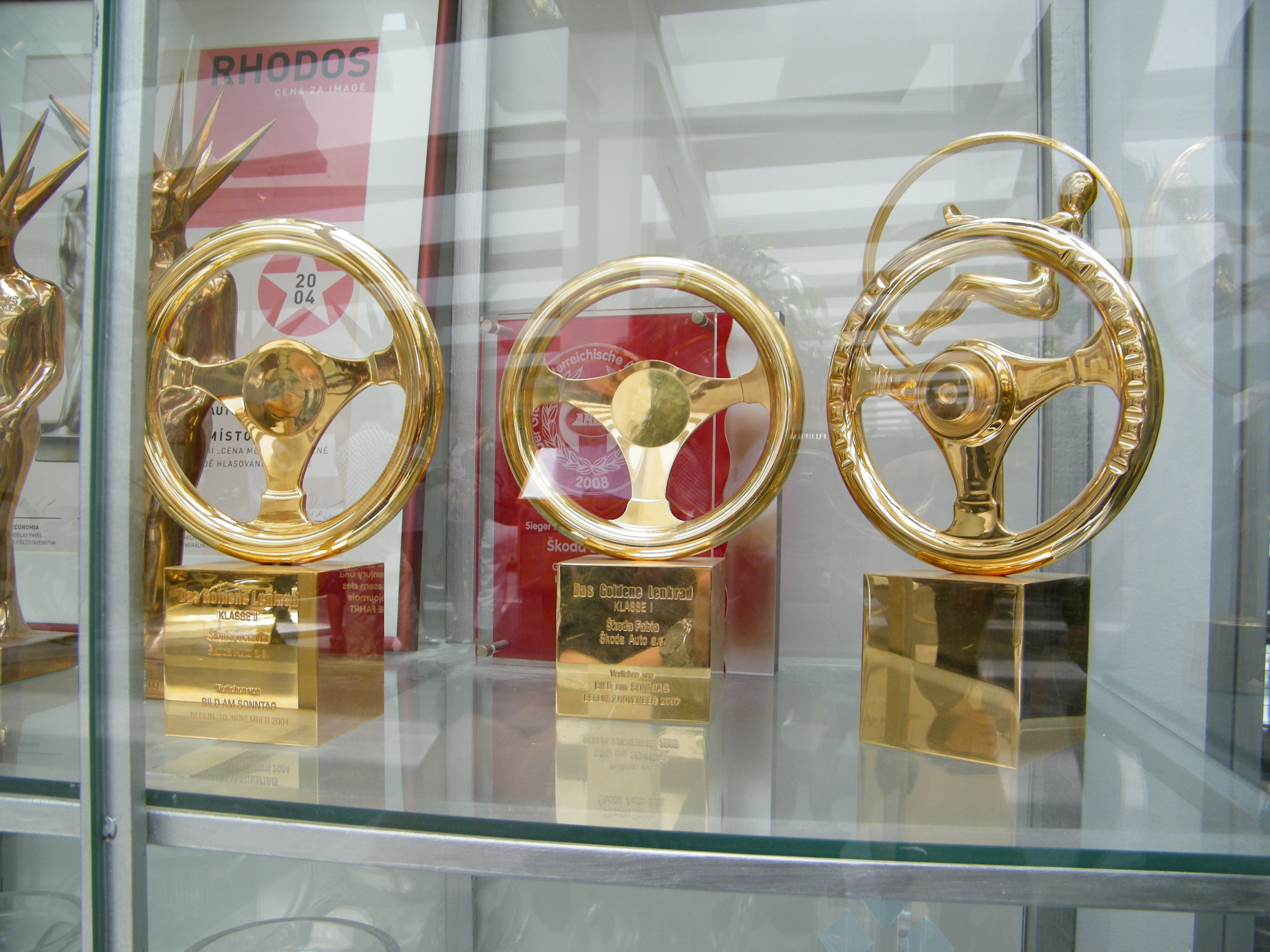
Golden Steering Wheels (Goldene Lenkräder).

Das Goldene Lenkrad ('The Golden Steering Wheel') is one of the best-known German awards for new car models. It has been awarded since 1976 by the Axel Springer SE-owned tabloid BILD am Sonntag (BamS), since 2009 in cooperation with Auto Bild.

The rules were tightened in 2017. For the first time, the results in everyday fuel consumption had an impact on the grading of the test cars. If the difference between the specified factory consumption and actual consumption was too large on a fixed test track, this led to the deduction of points.

In addition, the vehicles were randomly inspected by the independent testing organisation DEKRA. If there were too many deviations from the legal limits applicable from September 2017, the car was disqualified.

Tom Drechsler, Editor-in-Chief Auto of the BILD Group: "The new tests in the style of doping controls have two consequences: They make the prize even more valuable: for the customers and for those who build the cars."

In the case of diesel vehicles, the DEKRA test was mainly concerned with nitrogen oxide emissions; in the case of petrol engines, the particle values were determined.

The 2018 award ceremony was cancelled on 22 June 2018 due to exhaust gas manipulations.

== History ==
The prize was initiated by the publisher Axel Springer, who commissioned the former BamS author Hermann Harster to carry it out. In contrast to other car awards such as the Car of the Year, the prizewinners are not determined by journalists or readers, but in two-day test drives by an independent jury of experts, racing drivers and prominent drivers. The award ceremony takes place annually in November in Berlin. With the assumption of editorial responsibility by Peter Maahn, then head of the Auto department at BamS, the criteria of the award were professionalised in 1979. Over the years, the Golden Steering Wheel has developed into an institution which, according to a survey, is the most important German award for automobiles.

The award ceremony was broadcast on the ZDF television channel on 12 November 2000. Presented by Johannes B. Kerner, produced by Schwartzkopff-TV, the award winners were presented in Hangar 2 at Tempelhof Airport.

After 21 years, Maahn handed over responsibility to his successor Joachim Walther in December 2000. In 2007, the Green Steering Wheel was awarded for the best environmental innovation for the first time.

Since this year, Tom Drechsler, Editor-in-Chief Auto of the BILD Group and Editor-in-Chief AUTO BILD, together with Marion Horn, Editor-in-Chief of the BamS, bear overall editorial responsibility for the Golden Steering Wheel.

== The trophy ==
The Golden Steering Wheel is made of gold plated brass and was designed in November 1975 by the then 82-year-old goldsmith Walter W. Franke. Within three days and nights, he carved a 32-centimetre-high pedestal and the 15-centimetre diameter steering wheel from wood. This wooden model then served as a model for the brass casting, which was finally covered with gold.

The lettering on the base contains the name of the vehicle class, the vehicle, the manufacturer and the date on which the prize was awarded.

== The jury ==
In the last 30 years, the international jury that participated in the decision included, among others: Sir Peter Ustinov, Michael Schumacher, Juan Manuel Fangio, Walter Röhrl, Karl-Heinz Rummenigge, Thomas Gottschalk, Frank Elstner, Nina Ruge, Jörg Wontorra, David Coulthard, Peter Maffay, Barbara Schöneberger, Nick Heidfeld, Rolf Stommelen or Hans-Joachim Stuck. Only two jurors (Hans Herrmann and Erhard Schwind) have been involved in all 30 decisions to date. The jury traditionally consists of three different groups: technicians, motor sportsmen and celebrities. Each of the groups evaluates different criteria that correspond to their respective automotive know-how. The winner of the Honorary Steering Wheel is not chosen by the jury, but by a panel of BamS editors and publishers. A jury of experts from politics, environmental associations, the automotive industry and automobile clubs will decide on the Green Steering Wheel after a pre-selection by the readers.

The Golden Steering Wheel is a reader's choice in the first step. They determine the four models per class that go one lap further and are tested in Balocco in northern Italy. An international jury of experts will examine the winning cars according to various criteria. Among other things, designers evaluate the design there, and connectivity experts check the networking of the cars. Celebrities such as entertainer Barbara Schöneberger and crime scene star Richy Müller rate the driving pleasure and racing drivers such as Formula 3 driver Mick Schumacher and rally legend Walter Röhrl transmission, suspension and brakes.

== The award ceremony ==
Except for the years 2000 to 2002, the award ceremony always took place in the Axel-Springer-Haus in Berlin. In the three years mentioned, the Golden Steering Wheel was broadcast on ZDF from Berlin's Tempelhof Airport. The most famous award ceremony was on 9 November 1989, when the Berlin Wall fell. At that time, many guests of the event took the opportunity to visit the eastern sector of the divided city for the first time during the night without checks. Conversely, numerous residents of East Berlin spontaneously attended the after-show party. At the 1999 award ceremony, Nina Ruge suffered minor burns during the burning down of a stage firework, which met with a great response from the media.

== Honorary awards ==
In addition to the vehicles, from 1983 honorary prizes were also awarded to personalities for special merits. The prizewinners were:

- 1983: Henry Ford
- 1984: Ferry Porsche
- 1985: Giovanni Agnelli
- 1986: Franz Stadler
- 1987: Lee Iacocca
- 1988: Daniel Goeudevert
- 1989: Eberhard von Kuenheim
- 1990: Carl Hahn
- 1991: Raymond Lévy
- 1992: Louis R. Hughes
- 1993: Michael Schumacher
- 1994: Bernd Pischetsrieder
- 1995: Giorgetto Giugiaro
- 1996: Wendelin Wiedeking
- 1997: Ferdinand Piëch
- 1998: Jürgen Schrempp
- 1999: Louis Schweitzer
- 2000: Jacques Nasser
- 2001: Joachim Milberg
- 2002: Jürgen Hubbert
- 2003: Robert A. Lutz
- 2004: Helmut Panke
- 2005: Dieter Zetsche
- 2006: Martin Winterkorn
- 2007: Lewis Hamilton
- 2008: Franz Fehrenbach
- 2009: Luca di Montezemolo
- 2010: Norbert Reithofer
- 2011: Alan Mulally
- 2012: Ferdinand Piëch
- 2013: Peter Schreyer
- 2014: Elon Musk
- 2015: Ratan Tata
- 2016: Mary Barra
- 2017: Håkan Samuelsson

== See also ==
- List of motor vehicle awards
