= Helmut Girndt =

German philosopher and academic (born 1934)

- Born: May 13, 1934 (age 92)

Academic background
- Education: LMU Munich

Helmut Girndt (born May 13, 1934) is an emeritus professor of philosophy at the Institut für Philosophie in the University of Duisburg-Essen. As a major specialist in the philosophy of Johann Gottlieb Fichte, Girndt has been described as one of the leading representatives of Neo-Fichteanism in Germany.

== Life and works ==
Girndt received his doctorate in 1959 from LMU Munich via Hegel's "Differenzschrift" (Die Differenz des Fichteschen und Hegelschen Systems in der Hegelschen ‚Differenzschrif), qualified as a postdoctoral fellow with a thesis on Max Weber, spent a year at the University of California, Berkeley and then taught as an assistant and associate professor in the USA. He was appointed to the University of Duisburg-Essen in 1973, he became co-founder of the “International Johann Gottlieb Fichte Society” in 1987 and was elected its president in 1997. Teaching and research stays took him to New Mexico, Korea and Japan. He is the author of two monographs, editor of writings of various philosophical content and about fifty scientific essays.

== Publications ==
- »Natur« in der Transzendentalphilosophie. Begriff und Konkretion. Vol. 2. Duncker und Humblot. August 26, 2015. doi:10.3790/978-3-428-54535-3. ISBN 978-3-428-54535-3.
- Girndt, Helmut (2025). Das soziale Handeln als Grundkategorie erfahrungswissenschaftlicher Soziologie (in German). Mohr Siebeck. doi:10.1628/978-3-16-165622-4. ISBN 978-3-16-165622-4.
- Girndt, Helmut (1996). Philosophen über das Lehren und Lernen der Philosophie (in German). Academia Verlag. ISBN 978-3-88345-473-3.
