= NRW School of Governance =

Central institution at the University Duisburg-Essen

- Established: 2006
- Affiliation: University Duisburg-Essen
- Academic staff: 37
- Students: 30 / year
- Location: Duisburg, North Rhine-Westphalia, Germany
- Website: www.nrwschool.de

The NRW School of Governance is a central institution within the Institute for Political science at the University Duisburg-Essen and was founded in 2006 under the direction of Karl-Rudolf Korte.

It aims, through research and teaching, to promote the scientifically sound understanding of political processes (in North Rhine-Westphalia) and does so by educating and training students in three main programs: A masters program, titled, "Political management, Public policy and Public administration", a part-time masters program ("Public Policy") and a doctoral program.

== History ==
On 8 November 2006, the NRW School of Governance was officially opened in a ceremony by then Prime Minister of North Rhine-Westphalia, Jürgen Rüttgers. The launch of the institution was also made possible through sponsoring by the Germany company RAG. The company donated €100,000 over the course of two years, to help start the NRW School of Governance. In May 2016 the school celebrated its 10th anniversary, which was attended by President of the Bundestag Prof. Dr. Norbert Lammert.

== Organization and administration ==
=== Leadership ===
Karl-Rudolf Korte is the Director of the NRW School of Governance. Markus Hoffmann is the General Manager.

At the NRW School of Governance there are two "core professorships". Christoph Bieber is the holder of the Welker Endowed Professorship for Ethics in Political Management and Society, which focuses on ethical issues in the political decision-making process as well as questions about responsibility, trust, credibility and transparency in politics, the public and society. The chair of the public policy and state politics professorship is Andreas Blätte.

=== Guest teachers / lecturers ===
Experts from politics, the media, business and science are integrated into the teaching in order to impart the study contents as practically as possible to the students.

(Past) Guest lecturers of the NRW School of Governance include:

- Rupert Antes – managing director Haniel Foundation
- Moritz Ballensiefen – Personal advisor to the chief executive officer at Forschungszentrum Jülich
- Frank Bätge – Professor of Public Law at the University of Applied Sciences North Rhine-Westphalia
- Klaus Beck – Head of WDR-Studio Duisburg
- Fritz Behrens MdL – Member of the North Rhine-Westphalian Landtag; former Minister of the Interior and Justice of the Land North Rhine-Westphalia
- Knut Bergmann – Head of Communications and Capital Office, Institute of German Business Cologne
- Rainer Bischoff MdL – Member of the North Rhine-Westphalian Landtag
- Harald Brand – former editor-in-chief and program group leader of the NRW state programs
- Karsten Brenner – Ministerial Director a.D .; chairman of the board of the Federal Chancellor Willy Brandt Foundation
- Stephan Bröchler – Senior Researcher at the NRW School of Governance
- Mathias Bucksteeg – managing director semant! K – Ideas for Communication, Berlin; former Head of Unit in the Planning and Policy Department of the Federal Chancellery
- Lutz Dommel – managing director pdc eu affairs – public & policy affairs in Brussels and Honorary Consul of the Republic of Macedonia
- Hans Eichel – Federal Minister of Finance a.D.
- Michael Eilfort – Eberhard Karls University Tübingen and Board of the Stiftung Marktwirtschaft
- Frank Fischer – Professor of Political Science and Public Administration at Rutgers University, New Jersey
- Thomas Fischer – Head of the Brussels office of the Bertelsmann Stiftung
- Wolfgang Clement Federal Minister a. D., Prime Minister a. D.
- Rüdiger Frohn Secretary of State a. D.
- Eckart Gaddum Head of the main editorial office Neue Medien at ZDF
- Manuela Glaab Head of the Research Group Germany
- Richard Hilmer managing director infratest dimap
- Bodo Hombach managing director of the WAZ Media Group
- Hannelore Kraft party chairman of the NRW-SPD
- Norbert Lammert President of the German Bundestag
- Werner Müller Federal Minister a. D. and chief executive officer of Evonik Industries
- Wolfgang Nowak Head of the Alfred Herrhausen Society
- Frank Plasberg TV presenter
- Peter Radunski Senator a. D. and campaign manager
- Sabine Scholt moderator WDR-TV
- Jörg Schönenborn editor-in-chief WDR television
- Hajo Schumacher journalist and author

=== Visiting Professorship ===
The "Visiting Professorship for Political Management of Stiftung Mercator" is awarded once a year by the NRW School of Governance at the University of Duisburg-Essen. In 2011, the Federal Minister of Finance a. D. and former Prime Minister of North Rhine-Westphalia, Peer Steinbrück, has been awarded the visiting professorship for policy management. As experts of political practice, the visiting professors are available to the Master's students in seminars as part of the study program, but there are also public events for those interested in the University of Duisburg-Essen.

Previous holders of the Mercator professorship were:

- 2018 – Rita Süssmuth – Bundestag President a. D., Federal Minister a. D.
- 2016 – Christian Wulff – Federal President a. D., Prime Minister a. D.
- 2015 – Christine Bergmann – Federal Minister for Family Affairs, Senior Citizens, Women and Youth a. D.
- 2014 – Günter Verheugen – Vice-President of the European Commission a. D.
- 2013 – Jutta Limbach – former President of the Federal Constitutional Court
- 2012 – Bernhard Vogel – former Prime Minister of Rhineland-Palatinate
- 2011 – Peer Steinbrück – Federal Minister of Finance a. D. and former Prime Minister of NRW
- 2010 – Stefan Aust – former editor-in-chief of the Spiegel
- 2009 – Antje Vollmer – Vice President of the German Bundestag a. D. and former group leader of the German Green Party
- 2008 – Fu-Chang Chang – Professor at the Institute for European Studies at Tamkang University in Taipei
- 2007 – Wolfgang Clement – former Prime Minister of NRW

== Academics ==
=== Master programs ===
Currently the NRW School of Governance offers two master programs (2018):

==== 1. Master Political Management, Public Policy and Public Administration ====
Since the winter semester 2006/2007, the Master program "Political Management, Public Policy and Public Administration" has been offered at the NRW School of Governance. Hundreds of students apply for the 30 annual slots. The program lasts a total of six semesters and is designed to prepare the graduates for leadership in politics, associations, companies and administration.

Guest lecturers from politics, media, economics and science supplement the curriculum and are to impart the study contents as practically as possible to the students. In the area of applied political research, the degree program conveys knowledge about organizational, communication and control techniques as well as core competencies for problem analysis and solution.

The program is divided into nine modules:

1. Modern governance and policy management in the multi-level system
2. Methods and Research designs
3. Public administration and Management
4. Public, public opinion and strategic communication
5. Policy and policy analysis
6. Practical policy management
7. Internship
8. Orientation knowledge policy management
9. Colloquium and Master Thesis

==== 2. Master of Public Policy (MPP) ====
The Master program in Public Policy is aimed at decision-makers in administrations, associations, media, companies or other public-policy organizations and institutions. It is designed as a part-time Masters over the course of two years. There are 15–20 slots per semester available. The two-year Masters costs a total of around €12.000.

=== Promotionskolleg ===
The Promotionskolleg is a doctoral program that bundles the activities of the NRW School of Governance to promote doctoral candidates. Different doctoral programs and Scholarships are offered at the NRW School of Governance. These programs offer the beneficiaries not only financial means but also special retreats for the doctoral program, method workshops, research trips and conference participation. This targeted placement of key qualifications should support a quick and successful doctorate. For students of the Master Program Politics Management with outstanding academic achievements it is possible to be included in the excellence program of the NRW School of Governance, the so-called "fast track". The excellence program is designed to give students an accelerated and structured PhD within two years. In doing so, the doctoral students can decide whether to study the Master's degree program in the first year of the program or to concentrate fully on their doctoral studies. Sponsor of the excellence program since 2007 is the Stiftung Mercator.

Sponsors of the different programs are:

1. WestLB-Stiftung Zukunft NRW
2. Haniel-Stiftung
3. Stiftung Mercator
4. WAZ Mediengruppe
5. Welker-Stiftung
6. Georgsmarienhütte Holding GmbH

=== External workshops and qualifications ===
The NRW School of Governance designs and organizes qualification programs for external target groups. In seminars, the contents of the Master's program are provided as continuing education formats for working groups, institutions and companies.
