= Frank T. Rothaermel =

American academic

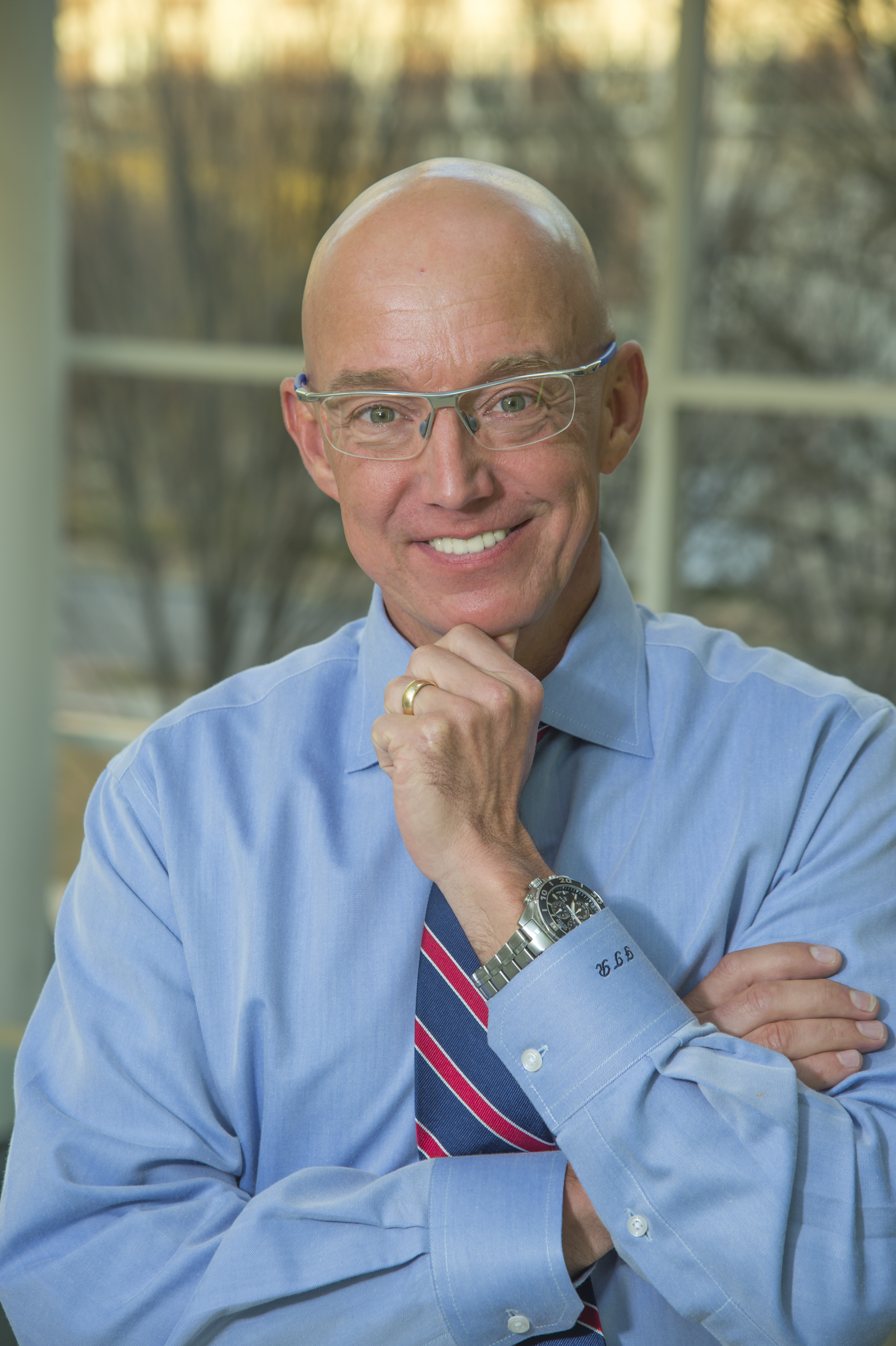
- Born: Butzbach, Germany
- Education: University of Washington (Ph.D.); Brigham Young University (MBA); University of Duisburg-Essen (M.Sc.)
- Occupations: Professor, author
- Organization: Scheller College of Business at the Georgia Institute of Technology
- Known for: Strategy, Innovation, and Entrepreneurship
- Notable work: Strategic Management
- Title: The Russell and Nancy McDonough Chair of Business, Alfred P. Sloan Industry Studies Fellow
- Website: ftrstrategy.com

Frank T. Rothaermel is a professor in the Scheller College of Business at the Georgia Institute of Technology and an Alfred P. Sloan Industry Studies Fellow. He holds the Russell and Nancy McDonough Chair of Business.

Rothaermel held visiting professorships at the EBS University of Business and Law (Germany), Singapore Management University (Tommie Goh Professorship), and the University of St. Gallen (Switzerland).

== Early life and education ==
Frank T. Rothaermel is a native of Butzbach, Germany and a naturalized U.S. citizen.

He graduated from the Weidig Gymnasium before studying economics at the University of Duisburg-Essen. During this time, he spent an academic year in England at Sheffield Hallam University as Erasmus Scholar. In 1993, Rothaermel completed his economic studies as Diplom-Volkswirt (M.Sc. equivalent). He wrote his master's thesis about the International Monetary Fund, providing a public policy comparison of macroeconomic stabilization programs in Latin America vs. Eastern Europe, especially Poland.

In 1995, Rothaermel obtained an MBA at the Marriott School of Management at Brigham Young University. In 1999, he then received a Ph.D. in Strategic Management with a minor in Economics from the Foster School of Business at the University of Washington. His doctoral advisor was Charles W. L. Hill. Rothaermel's doctoral thesis is entitled "Creative Destruction or Creative Cooperation?: An Empirical Investigation of Technological Discontinuities and Their Effect on the Nature of Competition and Firm Performance. A paper from his dissertation received the Academy of Management Newman Award.

== Career ==
After completing his Ph.D., Rothaermel stayed at the Foster School of Business at the University of Washington to research and teach in the Executive MBA programs. Between 2000 and 2003, Rothaermel was a tenure-track assistant professor at the Eli Broad College of Business at Michigan State University. In 2003, he joined the Georgia Institute of Technology. In 2006, Rothaermel was promoted to associate professor with tenure, and in 2010, he was promoted to Full Professor. In 2013, Rothaermel was appointed The Russell and Nancy McDonough Chair of Business.

Rothaermel served as area coordinator for the Strategy & Innovation group at the Scheller College of Business. He also served as coordinator of the doctoral program in Strategy and Entrepreneurship at Georgia Tech and several college-wide (Promotion & Tenure) and Institute-wide (Strategic Plan Advisory) committees.

Rothaermel has a wide range of executive education experience, including teaching in programs at G.E. Management Development Institute (Crotonville, NY), Georgia Institute of Technology, Georgetown University, ICN Graduate Business School (France), Politecnico di Milano (Italy), St. Gallen University (Switzerland), and the University of Washington.

== Additional affiliations and memberships ==
Rothaermel currently serves (or served) on the editorial boards of the Academy of Management Journal, Academy of Management Review, Organization Science, Strategic Management Journal, and Strategic Organization.

== Publications ==
Rothaermel has published over 35 articles in leading academic journals such as the Academy of Management Journal, Academy of Management Review, Organization Science, Strategic Management Journal, and elsewhere.

Google Scholar lists 20,000 citations to Rothaermel's research, with an h-index of 37. Based on having published papers in the top 1% based on citations, Thomson Reuters identified him as one of the world's most influential scientific minds. He is listed among the top-100 scholars based on impact over more than a decade in economics and business. According to research conducted by the Meta-Research Innovation Center at Stanford University, Rothaermel is among the world's top 2% most-cited researchers. Looking at several indicators, the study analyzed data from 1996 through 2019, covering approximately 7 million scientists in 22 major fields ranging from chemistry to engineering to economics and business. Rothaermel, with a more recent Ph.D. vintage, ranks ranked #233 out of a total of 36,319 scholars in Business & Management over the last few decades, which is in the top 0.64%.

Rothaermel is also the author of a leading textbook—Strategic Management (1e 2012; 2e 2014; 3e 2016; 4e 2018; 5e 2020; translations: Greek, Korean, Mandarin, and Spanish). He also authored more than 20 "bestselling" case studies distributed by Harvard Business Publishing.

== Honors and awards ==
Rothaermel received a National Science Foundation CAREER Award. He has won several teaching and research awards, including the Academy of Management Newman Award, the Strategic Management Society Conference Best Paper Prize, the DRUID Conference Best Paper Award, and the Israel Strategy Conference Best Paper Prize. He also received Sloan Industry Studies Best Paper Award for his 2007 Organization Science Paper. Rothaermel also received different teaching awards for excellence in the classroom, including the GT-wide Georgia Power Professor of Excellence award and the University of Washington Distinguished Teaching Award.

Bloomberg Businessweek named Rothaermel one of Georgia Tech's Prominent Faculty, while Poets & Quants selected Rothaermel as one of the "Favorite Business School Professors Teaching MBAs". The Ewing Marion Kauffman Foundation views Rothaermel as one of the world's 75 thought leaders in entrepreneurship and innovation.
