= Louis R. Hughes =

American business executive (born 1949)

- Born: February 10, 1949 (age 77); Cleveland, Ohio
- Occupation: Business
- Known for: CEO of Opel; General Motors executive

Louis R. Hughes (born February 10, 1949) is an American business executive.

Hughes received a Bachelor of Mechanical Engineering at Kettering University in 1971 and an MBA at Harvard University in 1973. He was with General Motors from 1973 to 2000, where he held various positions in the United States and overseas. From 1992 to 2000 he was executive vice president and member of the GM President's Council. As one of the company's six leading employees, he was responsible for strategic, financial and personnel decisions. Hughes has also held senior positions in a number of companies including Opel, Deutsche Bank, Alcatel-Lucent, Lockheed Martin, OutPerformance and has been Chairman of InZero Systems since 2011.

From 2004 to 2005, he was the Chief of Staff of the Afghanistan Reconstruction Group in the United States Department of State.

== Awards ==
- 1992: Das Goldene Lenkrad Hononary Award
- 1993: Vernon A. Walters Award
