= ConRuhr =

German academic liaison office

ConRuhr (Consortium of the Ruhr-Universities) was the German academic liaison office that was established in 2004 by the Ruhr University Bochum, the Technical University of Dortmund and the University of Duisburg-Essen. The name has since been changed to UARuhr (University Alliance Ruhr). The three universities are located very close to each other in Germany's Ruhr area and characterized by a strong collaboration and joint initiatives.

With its seats in Midtown Manhattan, New York City, United States, Moscow, Russia, São Paulo and Rio de Janeiro, Brazil, UA Ruhr's primary purpose is to encourage educational internationalization by exchanging researchers, teaching staff and students between the three universities and institutions in Eastern Europe and South America, finding and linking contacts in the US, CIS, Brazil and Germany, as well as promoting the Ruhr area as a center of academic excellence. The offices in Brazil are no longer active.

University Alliance Ruhr was one of several German liaison offices established through an initiative by the German Academic Exchange Service (DAAD), which accepted combined applications from institutions of higher educations and now supports the selected offices with already established contacts and office space. It remains one of the oldest still active liaison offices in North America through this initiative.
