= Peter Bialobrzeski =

German photographer and professor

Peter Bialobrzeski (born 1961 in Wolfsburg, West Germany) is a photographer and a professor of photography at the University of the Arts Bremen in Germany.

Bialobrzeski originally studied politics and sociology in Germany before he studied photography at University of Essen and at the London College of Printing (now University of the Arts London).

Bialobrzeski's photographs have been published in many magazines, and he has worked for corporate clients such as Daimler-Chrysler, Philip Morris, Siemens, and Volkswagen. He taught as a visiting professor at the University of Essen before he was appointed in 2002 as a professor for photography at the University of the Arts Bremen.

Bialobrzeski is perhaps best known for his exhibit Neon Tigers, photos of ballooning metropolises in Asia. He won several awards including the World Press Photo Award 2003 and 2010 and published eight books.

== Selected works ==
- 1997 Transit: Passagen globaler Kooperation, Edition Braus, Heidelberg ISBN 9783894661786
- 2000 XXX Holy-Journeys into the Spiritual Heart of India, Kruse Verlag, Hamburg ISBN 9783934923041
- 2004 Neon Tigers: Photographs of Asian Megacities, Hatje Cantz, Ostfildern ISBN 9783775713948
- 2008 Calcutta: Chitpur Road Neighborhoods, Hatje Cantz Verlag, Ostfildern ISBN 9783775721066
- 2010 Case Study Homes, Hatje Cantz Verlag, Ostfildern ISBN 9783775724692
- 2011 The Raw and the Cooked, Hatje Cantz Verlag, Ostfildern ISBN 9783775731928
