= Barbara Albert (chemist) =

German chemist

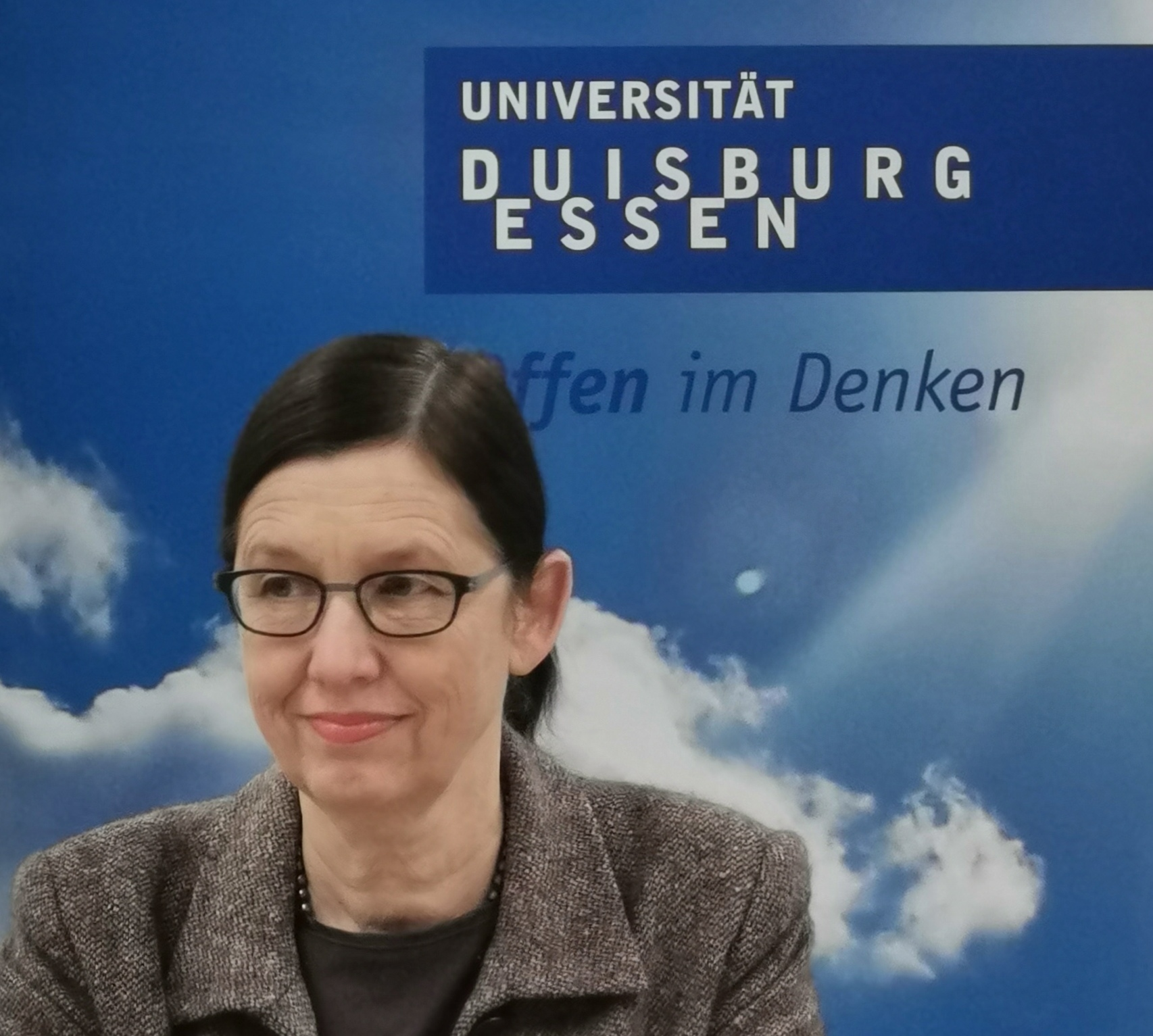
- Born: 9 December 1966 (age 59); Bad Godesberg, West Germany
- Education: University of Bonn
- Scientific career
- Fields: Chemistry
- Workplaces: Technische Universität Darmstadt; University of Hamburg; University of Duisburg-Essen
- Thesis: Tetramethylammoniumsalze als Analoga von Alkalimetallsalzen (Tetramethylammonium salts as analogues of alkali metal salts) (1995)

Barbara Ruth Albert (born 9 December 1966) is a German chemist and rector of the University of Duisburg-Essen. She was Professor of Solid State Chemistry at the Eduard-Zintl-Institute for Inorganic and Physical Chemistry of the Technische Universität Darmstadt. From 2012 to 2013 she was the president of the German Chemical Society.

Her research focuses on the synthesis of borides, borates and hydro borates, and solids with interesting physical properties.

== Life ==
Albert studied Chemistry at the University of Bonn from 1985 to 1990. She worked on her dissertation in the group of Martin Jansen until 1995. With the help of the Feodor Lynen Fellowship of the Alexander von Humboldt Foundation, she worked as a postdoctoral fellow at the Materials Research Laboratory of the University of California, Santa Barbara in the group of Anthony Cheetham. In 2000 she habilitated at the University of Bonn, where she became a Privatdozent in 2001. In the same year she became a professor at the University of Hamburg, where she was also Managing Director of the Institute for Inorganic and Applied Chemistry from 2003 to 2005. From 2005 to 2022 she was a professor at the Technische Universität Darmstadt. From 2012 to 2013 she was the president of the German Chemical Society. She has been a member of the supervisory board of Evonik Industries since 2014 and of the supervisory board of the Schunk Group since 2016. Since April 2022, she is rector of the University of Duisburg-Essen.

== Awards ==
- Bennigsen-Foerder Prize in 1997
- Prize of the Working Group of German University Professors of Chemistry (ADUC) in 2000
- Member of the Berlin-Brandenburg Academy of Sciences since 2016
