= Mercator School of Management =

Business school

- Type: Public business school
- Established: 2005
- Dean: Alf Kimms
- Location: (Germany) Duisburg, North Rhine-Westphalia, Germany
- Campus: Urban
- Website: msm.uni-due.de

The Mercator School of Management (MSM) refers to the faculty of business administration of the University of Duisburg-Essen in North Rhine-Westphalia, Germany.

The Mercator School of Management is a classic business school located in Duisburg. It involves twenty-eight chairs, sixteen of them in different business administration and management disciplines, twelve of them in economics and other fields. The Chair of Internal Auditing is unique in Germany: "In December 2016, he [Univ.-Prof. Dr. Marc Eulerich] received a full professorship at the Chair of Internal Auditing, which is the only university chair in Germany with an explicit focus on Internal Auditing in both research and teaching." Each of the three pillars of the MSM combines four of those chairs in a research department.

== Academic programs ==
- Bachelor of Science
  - Business Administration
  - Business Education
- * Master of Science
  - (International) Business Administration
  - Accounting and Finance
  - Management and Marketing
  - Logistikmanagement (terminating)
  - Business Analytics
  - Supply Chain Management and Logistics
  - Telecommunications Management
  - Innopreneurship

== Research departments ==
The central research areas are "Accounting and Finance", "Technology and Operations Management", and "Management and Marketing", each of which is also responsible for a specialized master program of the same name.

In addition, the mainly service-oriented chairs have been combined in the Department of Managerial Economics, which presents the educating foundation of the Mercator School of Management. Next to the three chairs of Economics, it includes chairs of East Asia Studies covering the areas of Japan/Korea and China, a chair of Business Education and Didactics and the fields of Management Science and Business Law.

The european center for financial services (ecfs) is a research institute within the Mercator School of Management to connect research with practical knowledge in financial services.

The programs offered by the Mercator School of Management are conform to ECTS (European Credit Transfer System) guidelines to guarantee that credits earned abroad or at the MSM can easily be taken into account. The accredited Bachelor of Science in Business Administration offers A-level/Abitur graduates a first professional degree with a broad theoretical foundation.

After having earned an honor’s degree in the Bachelor of Science in Business Administration (or a comparable program), students can choose from seven alternative Master programs of four semesters each. The internationalized General Management Track allows students to specialize in one field from each of the three business administration departments mentioned above.

== Study abroad programs ==
The Mercator School of Management obliges students to spend a semester abroad. Some selected partner universities:

- Georgia Institute of Technology
- Copenhagen Business School
- Hong Kong Baptist University
- Paris-Sorbonne University
- University of Illinois at Urbana–Champaign
- Sophia University
- American University
- Warsaw School of Economics
- Hogeschool van Arnhem en Nijmegen
- Lehigh University

The MSM offers also a double-degree program, where students then be eligible to receive additional degrees like the MBA in cooperation with several American Universities.

== Rankings ==
The MSM is ranked by the Centrum für Hochschulentwicklung second in 2011 in the area "International Publications" as well as "Citation". The business newspaper Handelsblatt ranked the Mercator School of Management 17th for business schools in Germany, Austria and Switzerland.

== Notable people ==
- Heinz Hilgert, former CEO WestLB AG
- Hannelore Kraft, Minister-President of North Rhine-Westphalia
