= Klaus-Dieter Hungenberg =

German chemist (born 1953)

- Born: 14 September 1953 (age 72)
- Education: University of Essen
- Known for: Living anionic polymerization, Living free-radical polymerization, Mathematical model
- Scientific career
- Fields: Chemistry
- Workplaces: Boehringer Mannheim, BASF

Klaus-Dieter Hungenberg (born 14 September 1953) is a German chemist and professor at the University of Paderborn. Hungenberg has contributed to the field of reaction kinetics for polymerization processes, and has been honored with Professorship for his contributions in the field of reaction chemistry at the Institute for Polymer Material and Process (PMP), University of Paderborn.

== Education ==
Hungenberg studied Chemistry at the University of Duisburg-Essen and then received his Diploma in Anionic polymerization in 1979. Later, he received his PhD in 1982 in the group of Friedhelm Bandermann at the University of Duisburg-Essen with research projects focusing on anionic living free radical polymerization.

== Biography ==
From 1983 to 1987 Hungenberg worked in process development for blood diagnostic devices with Boehringer Mannheim GmbH, now Roche Diagnostics.

In 1987, he joined BASF’s Polymer research group. Since then, he has led diverse product and process development projects ranging from new PVC modifiers, polyolefin processes, catalysis, super absorbent polymers, emulsion polymers ABS, polyamides, etc. His main research emphasis is polymer reaction engineering modeling, simulation and optimization of polymer processes. He is an (co-)author of about 100 scientific articles, editorials and patents. He is also an (co-)author of a book chapter in process modelling and optimization of styrene polymerization with focus on polystyrene and its co-polymers.

K. D. Hungenberg has been at different leadership positions in BASF SE for many years. In 2004, he was named Research Director of Polymer Reaction Engineering at BASF SE. In 2010, he was appointed as Vice President Polymer Reaction Engineering in recognition for his achievements. In 2012 Hungenberg received an Honorary Professorship at the institute of Polymer, Materials and Processes (PMP), University of Paderborn. There he regularly gives lectures about Polymer Reaction Engineering and the Modeling of Polymer Processes. He is highly networked in the area of Polymer Reaction Engineering and is known globally for his contributions in this field.

Furthermore, he is an Editorial Board member of several international journals and acted as chairman and member for Scientific Committees of various conferences. He is engaged in the IUPAC Working Party "Modeling of Kinetics and Processes of Polymerization", the Working Party “Polymer Reaction Engineering” of EFCE and acts as Deputy Chairman of the DECHEMA Technical Committee "Polyreaktionen". In addition, he is lecturer in Dechema and responsible for the training course "Polymerisationstechnik".
