= Fu-Chang Chang =

Fu-chang Chang (born April 25, 1965, in Taiwan) is an associate professor at the Graduate Institute of European Studies at Tamkang University in Taiwan.

== Early life and education ==
Chang was born on April 25, 1965, in Taiwan and obtained his bachelor's degree at the German Department of Soochow University, Taiwan from 1984 to 1988. In 1991, he graduated with a master's from the Graduate Institute of European Studies at Tamkang University, Taiwan, and subsequently served in the army from 1991 to 1993. In 2006, he obtained his Dr. rer. pol. at the University of Cologne, Germany.

== Career ==
Chang started his career in academics in 1988, following his Bachelor's degree at Soochow University in Taiwan. He became a scientific assistant to Chong-ko Tzou at Tamkang University in Taipei in 1988 and worked for Tzou until 1991. From 1993-1994 he worked at the Chengchi University in Taipei, where he assisted Mao-hsiung Hung.

Since 2006 Chang has been the Executive Secretary at the Center for European Union Studies and an assistant professor at the Graduate Institute of European Studies at Tamkang University.

== Additional affiliations ==
In 2008, Chang was awarded the Mercator Visiting Professorship for Political Management at the University of Duisburg-Essen's NRW School of Governance. He gave both seminars and lectures at the university. He was also a visiting scholar at LMU Munich in Germany, the Vice Secretary General of the Chinese Homeland Security Research Association, Taiwan and “Global Vision” TV Program Host in Taiwan.

== Works ==
Chang's publications include:

=== Books ===
- Chang, Fu-chang: Geschichte von Schweden und Norwegen, Taipei: San-MinVerlag, 2008. (Chinese Version, in publication)
- Chang, Fu-chang: Autonomie und Allianz—EU statt NATO für die Europäische Sicherheit?, Baden-Baden: Nomos Verlag, 2008.
- Chang, Fu-chang: Auf dem Weg zur Europäischen Union, Taipei: San-Min Verlag, 2002. (289 pages, chinesische version, ISBN 957-14-3469-8)
