= Karl-Rudolf Korte =

German political scientist

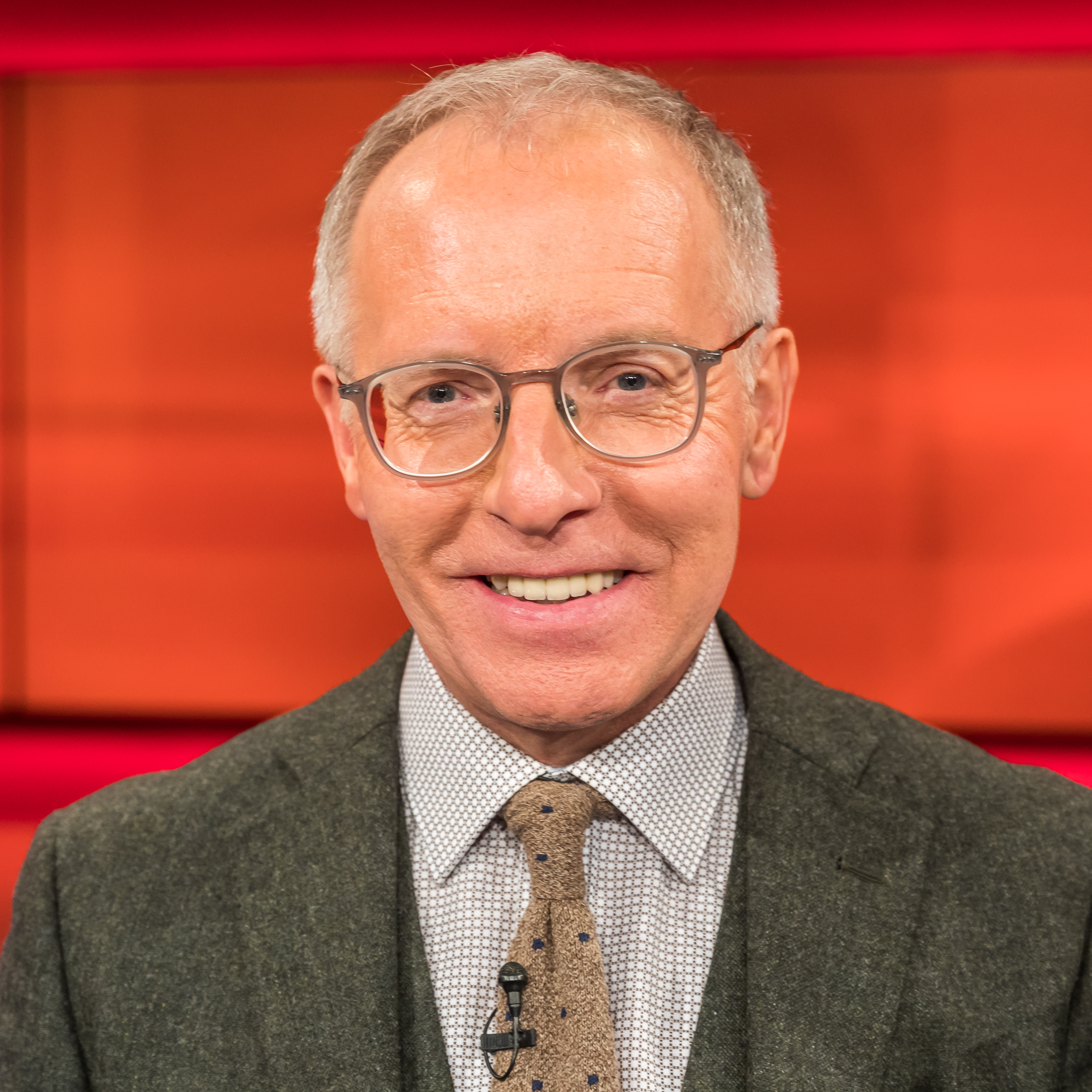
- Korte in 2020
- Born: November 15, 1958 (age 67); Hagen, Germany
- Known for: Psephology

Academic background
- Education: University of Mainz; University of Tübingen

Karl-Rudolf Korte (born November 15, 1958, in Hagen) is a German political scientist. From 2002 till the beginning of 2025 he has been professor at the University of Duisburg-Essen on Campus Duisburg. He appears regularly in national media as a guest for election analyses.

== Education ==
Korte studied Political Science, German and Pedagogy in Mainz and Tübingen. In 1983 he passed the state examination and in 1988 he became a doctor. phil. PhD at the University of Mainz.

== Career ==
=== Academic career ===
After completing his studies, Korte worked as a research assistant and head of several research projects at the University of Mainz until 1995.

Subsequently, he participated in the establishment of the Center for Applied Policy Research at LMU Munich. In 1997, Korte was habilitated at LMU Munich and was awarded a prize for the best habilitation thesis. After visiting professorships at the Universities of Trier, Cologne, Munich and Duisburg-Essen, he has been professor of Political Science at the University of Duisburg-Essen since 2002 at the chair "Political System of the Federal Republic of Germany and Modern Theories of the State".

He has been Director of the NRW School of Governance since 2006 and from 2010 to 2017 Dean of the Faculty of Social Sciences at the University of Duisburg-Essen.

==== Election analysis (psephology) ====
Korte became publicly known through his political analyses in daily newspapers, magazines and television. As a voting expert, he appears mainly on German news channels ZDF, WDR and Phoenix. His research focuses on the relationships between party strategies, media and voter behavior.

In 2010, the Internet portal "de:Wir in NRW" published e-mails to the then-CDU government in which Korte is looking to fund a research staff position. FAZ publisher Jürgen Kaube criticized that Korte had suggested to supply "benevolent" analysis (written by one of his scientific staff) against payment by the government. After the CDU suffered a significant loss of votes in the 2010 North Rhine-Westphalia state election, which led to a change of the state government, Korte provided a critical analysis of their policy.

In the 2015 migrant crisis, Korte contradicted the view that Angela Merkel had "lost the feel for the mood in the population," and described her attitude as "humanitarian and straightforward." The demands made by Markus Söder and other politicians for an upper limit for the influx of refugees Korte described as "pure symbolism" and "absurd".

== Additional affiliations ==
Korte was chairman of the German Society for Political Science from 2013 to 2015. He is the managing editor of the Zeitschrift für Politikwissenschaft and editorial advisory board of the magazine Politik & Kommunikation.

== Awards and recognitions ==
In November 2006, the magazine Unicum Beruf in cooperation with the auditing firm KPMG awarded Korte the title of Professor of the Year in the category of humanities, social sciences and cultural studies, acting as a "trailblazer for careers" and promoting young talent. He offers his students a network that brings them in constant contact with companies, so the reasoning of the initiators.

== Writings ==
- Karl-Rudolf Korte (Hrsg.): Die Bundestagswahl 2009: Analysen der Wahl-, Parteien-, Kommunikations- und Regierungsforschung Wiesbaden: VS Verlag für Sozialwissenschaften 2010.
- Karl-Rudolf Korte: "Das Bundeskanzleramt in der Organisationsanalyse. Informalität als Erfolgskriterium." In: Heinz-Jürgen Dahme/Norbert Wohlfahrt (Hrsg.): Systemanalyse als politische Reformstrategie.Wiesbaden: VS Verlag für Sozialwissenschaften 2010.
- Karl-Rudolf Korte: "Strategie und Regierung: Politikmanagement unter den Bedingungen von Komplexität und Unsicherheit." In: Joachim Raschke/Ralf Tils (Hrsg.): Strategie in der Politikwissenschaft. Konturen eines neuen Forschungsfelds.Wiesbaden: VS Verlag für Sozialwissenschaften 2010.
- Karl-Rudolf Korte, Manuel Fröhlich: Politik und Regieren in Deutschland, Strukturen, Prozesse, Entscheidungen. Paderborn u. a.: Schöningh/UTB 2009 (3. Aufl.).
- Karl-Rudolf Korte: "Darstellungs- und Entscheidungspolitik." In: Sascha Michel/Heiko Girnth (Hrsg.): Polit-Talkshows – Bühnen der Macht. Ein Blick hinter die Kulissen. Bonn: Bouvier 2009.
- Karl-Rudolf Korte: Wahlen in Nordrhein-Westfalen. Schwalbach/Ts.: Wochenschau-Verlag 2010 (2. Aufl.).
- Karl-Rudolf Korte: Wahlen in Deutschland. Bundeszentrale für politische Bildung, Bonn 2009 (6. Aufl.), ISBN 978-3-89331-953-4.
- Stefanie Delhees, Karl-Rudolf Korte, Florian Schartau, Niko Switek und Kristina Weissenbach: Wohlfahrtsstaatliche Reformkommunikation. Westeuropäische Parteien auf Mehrheitssuche. Baden-Baden: Nomos Verlag 2008.
- Nico Grasselt, Karl-Rudolf Korte: Führung in Politik und Wirtschaft – Instrumente, Stile und Techniken. Studien der NRW School of Governance. Wiesbaden: VS Verlag für Sozialwissenschaften 2007.
- Karl-Rudolf Korte, Martin Florack, Timo Grunden: Regieren in Nordrhein-Westfalen. Wiesbaden: VS Verlag für Sozialwissenschaften 2006.
- Karl-Rudolf Korte, Gerhard Hirscher: Information und Entscheidung, Kommunikationsmanagement der politischen Führung. Wiesbaden: Westdeutscher Verlag 2003.
- Karl-Rudolf Korte: „Das Wort hat der Herr Bundeskanzler“, Eine Analyse der Großen Regierungserklärungen von Adenauer bis Schröder. Wiesbaden: Westdeutscher Verlag 2002.
- Karl-Rudolf Korte, Werner Weidenfeld (Hrsg.): Deutschland-Trendbuch, Fakten und Orientierungen. Opladen: Leske und Budrich 2001.
- Karl-Rudolf Korte, Gerhard Hirscher: Aufstieg und Fall von Regierungen, Machterwerb und Machterosionen in westlichen Demokratien. München: Olzog Verlag 2001.
