= Erwin L. Hahn Institute for Magnetic Resonance Imaging =

Research institute

The Erwin L. Hahn Institute for Magnetic Resonance Imaging is a research institute which develops magnetic resonance imaging (MRI) for both cognitive neuroscience and medical diagnosis and treatment.

== History ==
It was founded in July 2005 by the University Duisburg-Essen (Germany) and the Radboud University Nijmegen (The Netherlands).

It is located on the grounds of the UNESCO World Cultural Heritage Zollverein in the Northeast of the city of Essen, Germany. The industrial complex Zollverein is a former coal mine and coke processing plant which represents an industry which dominated the industrialization of the Ruhr area in Germany during the 19th and 20th centuries.

The institute is named after Erwin L. Hahn, a physicist who has made innumerable contributions to the field of magnetic resonance. The centerpiece of the institute is a 7-tesla whole-body magnet resonance imager from Siemens Healthcare, Erlangen, Germany. In contrast to the magnetic resonance imagers used in hospitals and clinics throughout the world, which commonly operate at a magnetic field strength of 1.5-tesla, the ultra high magnetic field strength of this imager provides significantly higher sensitivity for structural and functional measurements of the human body.
