= Heike Mauer =

Heike Mauer is a German gender studies academic. She wrote a monograph about prostitution in Luxembourg and written about gender studies through the lens of postcolonialism and intersectionality. She works at the University of Duisburg-Essen.

== Career ==
Mauer studied at the University of Trier and Lund University. She attained her PhD from the University of Luxembourg in 2015, writing her dissertation on prostitution in Luxembourg from 1900 until the beginning of World War II. In 2018, Mauer published her monograph Intersektionalität und Gouvernementalität: Die Regierung von Prostitution in Luxemburg (Intersectionality and Governmentality: The Management of Prostitution in Luxembourg). The book linked the rise of sex work in Luxembourg with industrialisation.

She edited together with Johanna Leinius the 2021 book entitled Intersektionalität und Postkolonialität: Kritische feministische Perspektiven auf Politik und Macht (Intersectionality and Postcolonialism: Critical feminist perspectives on politics and power). In individual chapters broken up into three sections, authors make intersectional and postcolonial analyses. From 2016-2023 she was one of the speakers of the Section "Politik und Geschlecht" (Politics and Gender) in the de:Deutsche Vereinigung für Politikwissenschaft. (German Political Science Association). Since 2016, Mauer works at the University of Duisburg-Essen. and is a member of the Netzwerk Frauen- und Geschlechterforschung NRW (Women's and Gender Research Network NRW).

== Selected works ==
- Mauer, Heike; Leinius, Johanna (2021). Intersektionalität und Postkolonialität: Kritische feministische Perspektiven auf Politik und Macht (1 ed.). Verlag Barbara Budrich. ISBN 978-3-8474-2455-0. JSTOR j.ctv1c5cs1c.
- Mauer, Heike (2020). "Intersektional regieren: Die Regulierung von Prostitution und Sexarbeit". In Bührmann, Andrea; Astrid Biele, Mefebue; Grenz, Sabine (eds.). Handbuch Intersektionalitätsforschung (in German). Springer Fachmedien. pp. 1–14. ISBN 978-3-658-26613-4.
- Mauer, Heike (2018). Intersektionalität und Gouvernementalität: Die Regierung von Prostitution in Luxemburg. Vol. 30 (1 ed.). Verlag Barbara Budrich. ISBN 978-3-8474-2113-9. JSTOR j.ctvbkk27f.
