= Daniel Goeudevert =

- Born: 31 January 1942 (age 84); Reims, France
- Education: University of Reims; Sorbonne, Paris
- Occupations: Automotive executive, Author, Consultant
- Employer(s): Citroën, Renault, Ford, Volkswagen
- Known for: Former Volkswagen board member, Environmental advocate

Daniel Goeudevert (born 31 January 1942) is a French author, automotive executive, and consultant. He is best known for his leadership roles at Citroën, Renault, Ford, and Volkswagen, as well as his later work as a writer and environmental advocate.

== Early life and education ==
Goeudevert was born in Reims, France. After completing his baccalauréat in 1961, he studied literature at the University of Reims and the Sorbonne in Paris. He initially worked as a teacher of German before entering the automotive industry.

== Career ==
In 1965, Goeudevert began working as a car salesman at Citroën. His career advanced rapidly:

- 1969 – Appointed sales manager at Citroën.
- 1970 – Became general director of Citroën Switzerland at age 28.
- 1974 – Joined the board of Citroën Germany.
- 1975–1978 – Served as general director of Renault Germany.
- 1979 – Became head of exports at Renault.
- 1981–1989 – CEO of Ford's German operations.
- 1990–1993 – Member of the board of Volkswagen AG, responsible for sales and marketing.

Known for his unconventional style and outspoken views, Goeudevert was often described as a “showman” among auto executives. He left Volkswagen in 1993. He was also a recipient of the Das Goldene Lenkrad award, one of Germany's most recognized automotive honors.

== Later activities ==
After leaving the auto industry, Goeudevert became a consultant, author, and public speaker. He has written several books, including Das Seerosen-Prinzip (2003), which critiques greed and short-term thinking in business. His autobiographical book Wie ein Vogel im Aquarium (1998) further cemented his reputation as a Paradiesvogel (“paradise bird”) in the auto industry, reflecting his unconventional style and outsider perspective. He also served as Vice President of the International Green Cross, advocating for environmental protection.

== Publications ==
- Die Zeit der Verachtung ist vorbei (1993)
- Wie ein Vogel im Aquarium: Aus dem Leben eines Managers (1998)
- Das Seerosen-Prinzip: Wie uns die Gier ruiniert (2003)
- Die Zukunft der Mobilität (various essays and lectures)

== Legacy ==
Goeudevert is regarded as a visionary critic of the automotive industry, emphasizing sustainability, ethics, and social responsibility. His career trajectory—from literature teacher to top automotive executive—has been described as unique in the sector.
