= Technical University of Dortmund =

University in Dortmund, Germany

TU Dortmund University
- Technische Universität Dortmund
- Official logo of TU Dortmund University
- Former name: Universität Dortmund
- Type: Public
- Established: 16 December 1968; 57 years ago
- Affiliations: UA Ruhr – University Alliance Ruhr
- Budget: EUR 508 million
- Rector: Manfred Bayer
- Total staff: 4,230
- Students: 34,235
- Location: Dortmund, North Rhine-Westphalia, Germany
- Campus: 272 acres (110 ha); Urban/Suburban
- Website: www.tu-dortmund.de

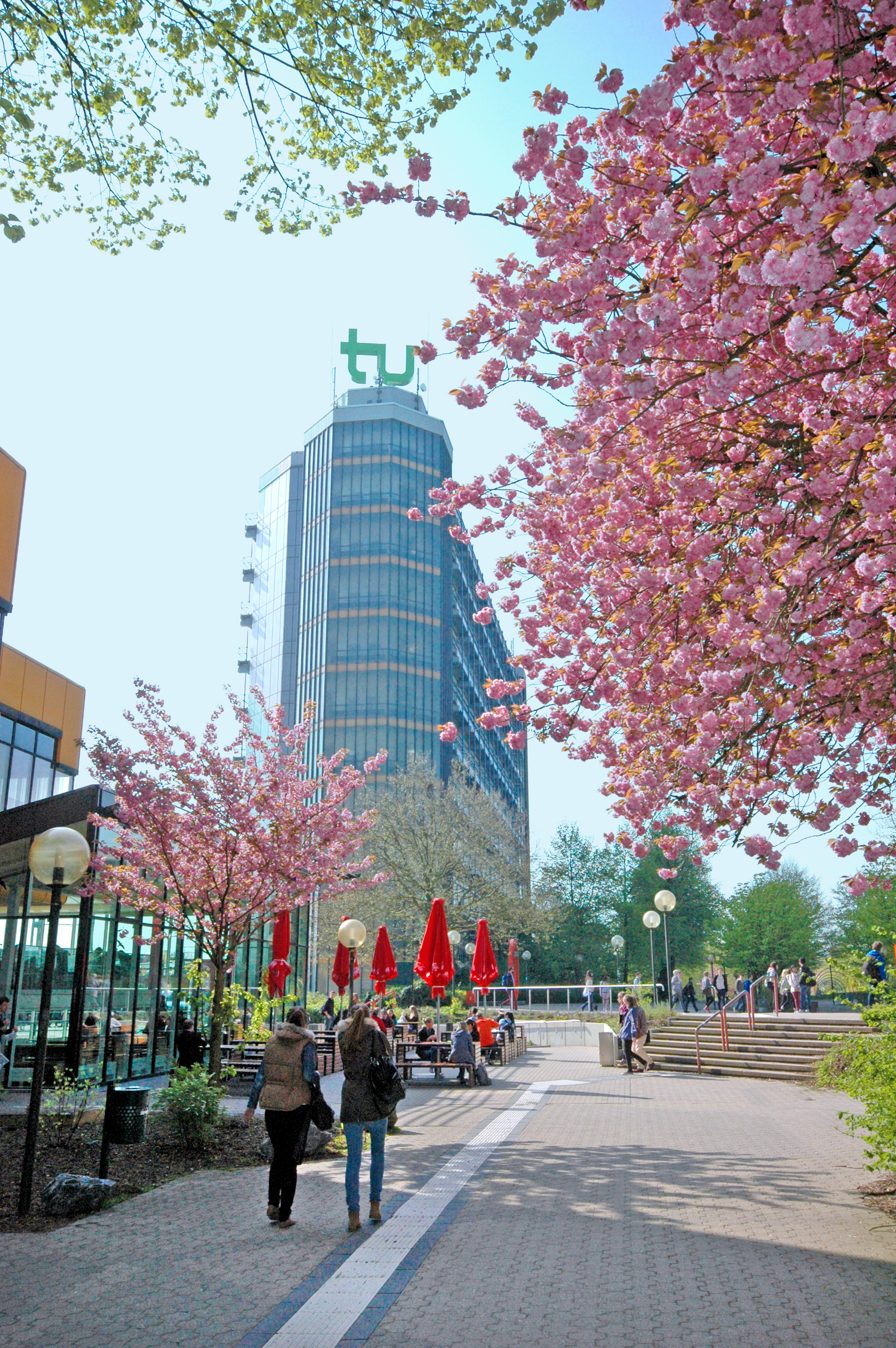
The Mathetower on the North Campus of TU Dortmund University

The Technical University of Dortmund (TU Dortmund University, German: Technische Universität Dortmund) is a public research university of the state of North Rhine-Westphalia, located in Dortmund.

The research and teaching focus of the university's 17 faculties is on engineering and natural sciences. These are complemented by geisteswissenschaften, cultural studies, and economics.

As a university of academic excellence, TU Dortmund University will receive funding through the Excellence Strategy starting in 2027, thus becoming part of Germany's leading research institutions.

Around 30,000 students are enrolled at TU Dortmund in 90 degree programs. This makes it one of the 20 largest universities in Germany. Physicist Manfred Bayer has been the university's rector since 2020. TU Dortmund is a founding member of the University Alliance Ruhr, with liaison offices and research collaborations in North and Latin America, Eastern Europe, and Central Asia.

The university pioneered the Internet in Germany, and contributed to machine learning (in particular, to support-vector machines, and RapidMiner).

== History ==
The University of Dortmund (German: Universität Dortmund) was founded in 1968, during the decline of the coal and steel industry in the Ruhr region. Its establishment was seen as an important move in the economic change (Strukturwandel) from heavy industry to technology. The university's main areas of research are the natural sciences, engineering, pedagogy/teacher training in a wide spectrum of subjects, special education, and journalism. The University of Dortmund was originally designed to be a technical university, but in 1980, it merged with the adjacent Pädagogische Hochschule Ruhr that housed mostly humanities.

In 2006, The University of Dortmund hosted the 11th Federation of International Robot-soccer Association (FIRA) RoboWorld Cup. The university's robot soccer team, the Dortmund Droids, became vice world champion in the RoboWorld Cup 2002 and finished third in 2003.

On 1 November 2007, The University of Dortmund was renamed as TU Dortmund University (Technische Universität Dortmund in German) through the adoption of a new constitution by the senate on 18 October 2007. The University is part of the cooperation program "University Alliance Ruhr", together with the Ruhr University Bochum and the University of Duisburg-Essen.

On 4 April 2019, Ursula Gather, Rector of TU Dortmund University abolished the institutes for German Language and Literature as well as English and American Studies.

== Campuses ==
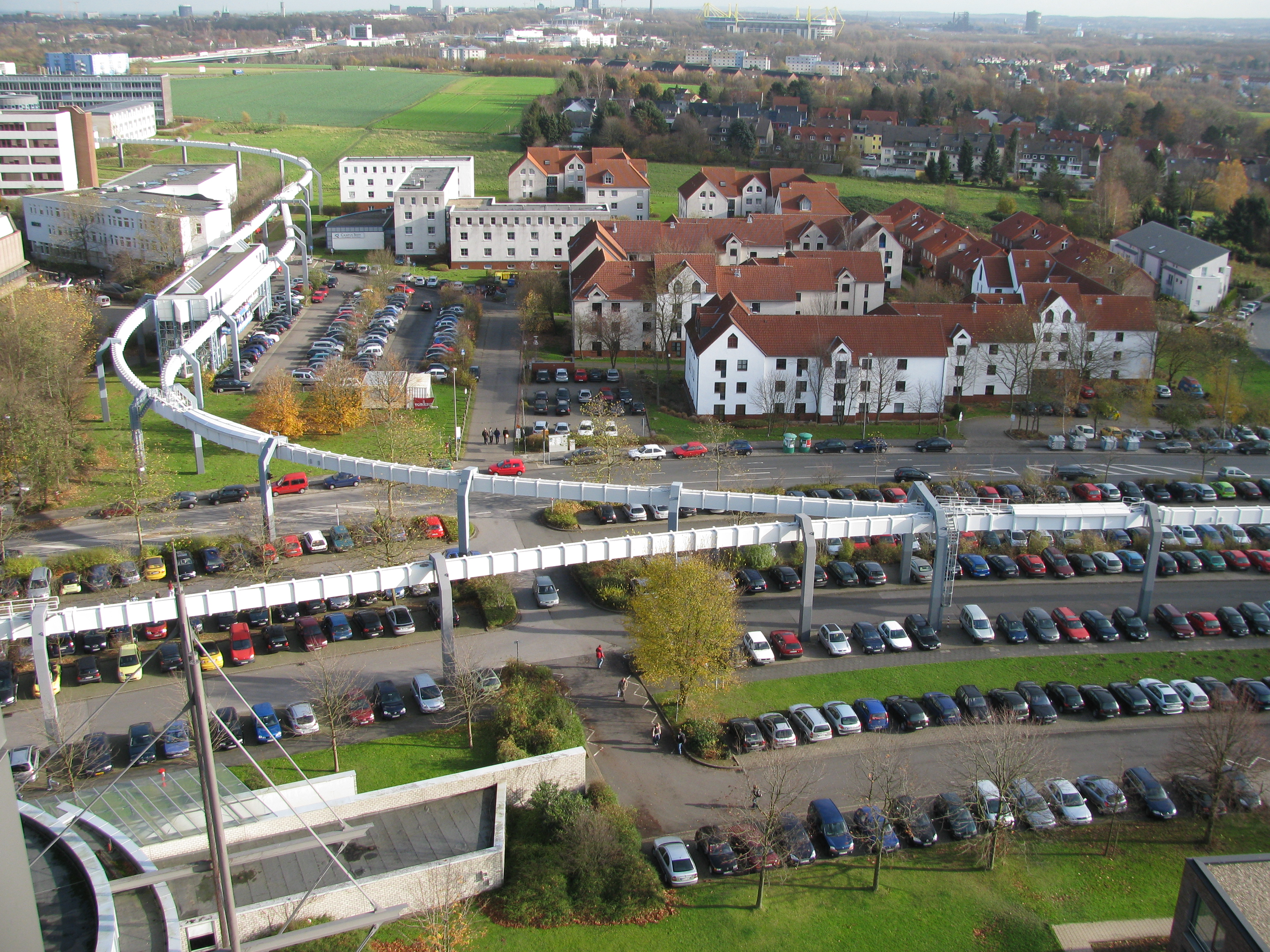
Student hostels

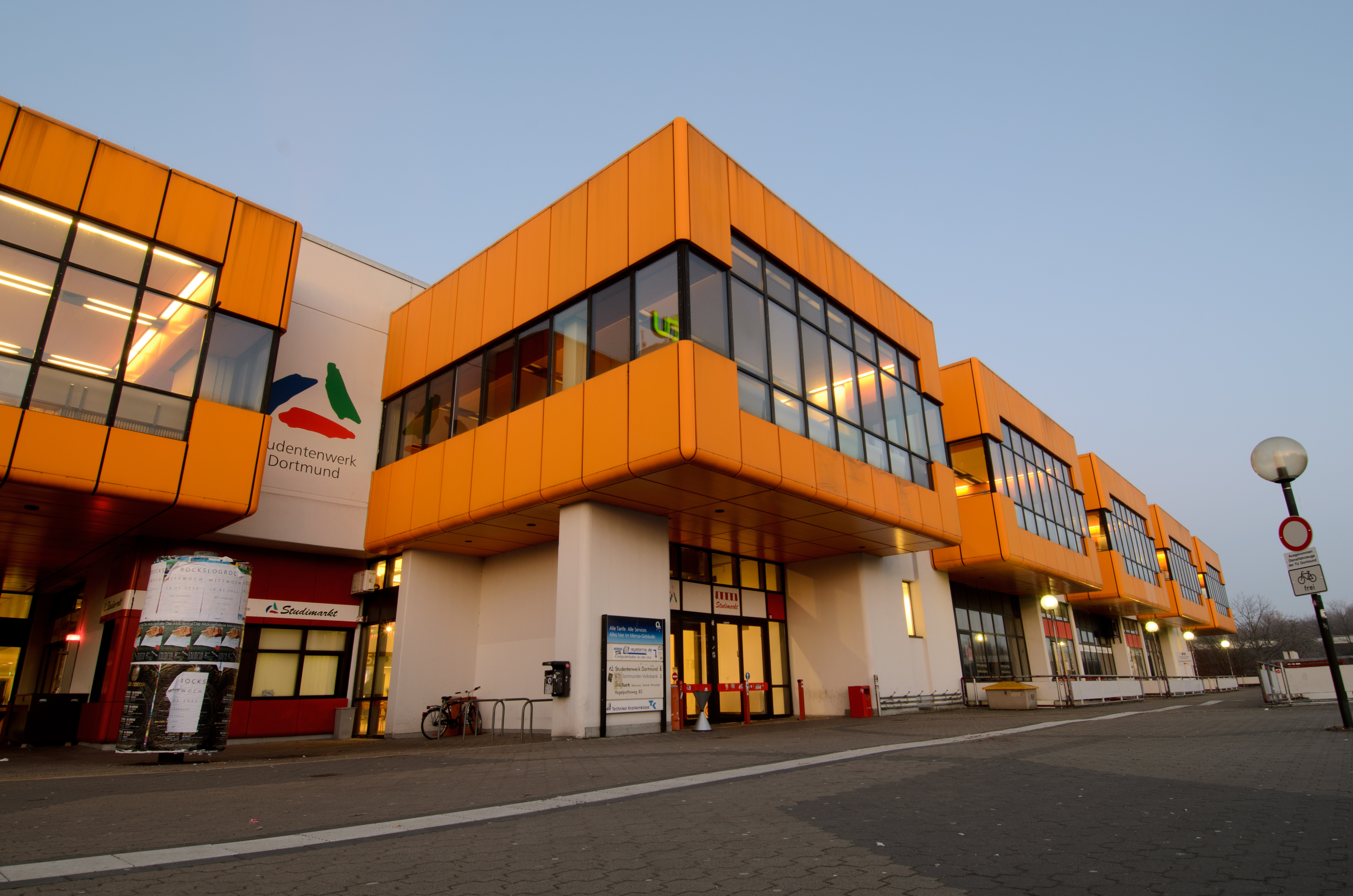
Campus Food Court

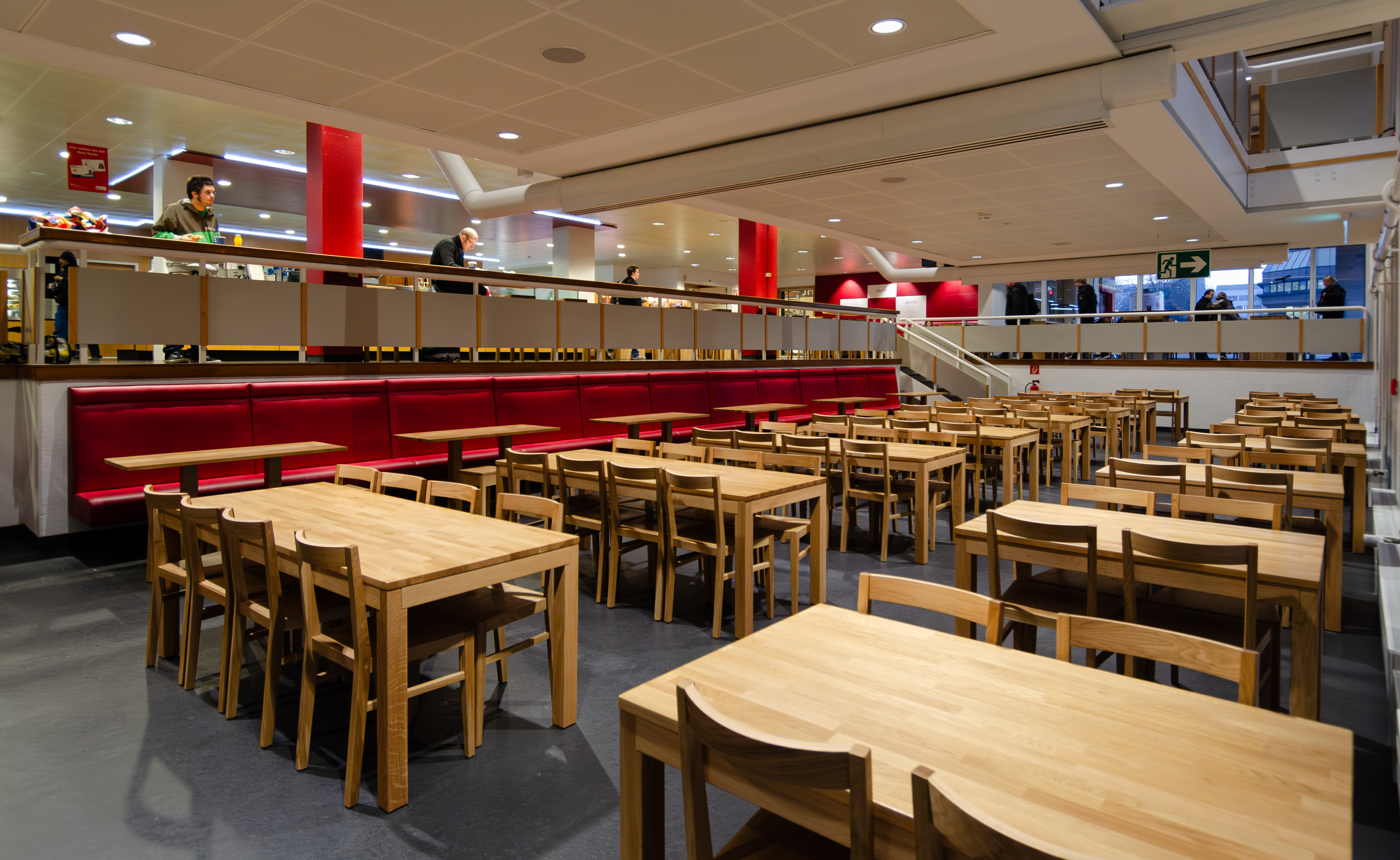
Renovated place inside Food court

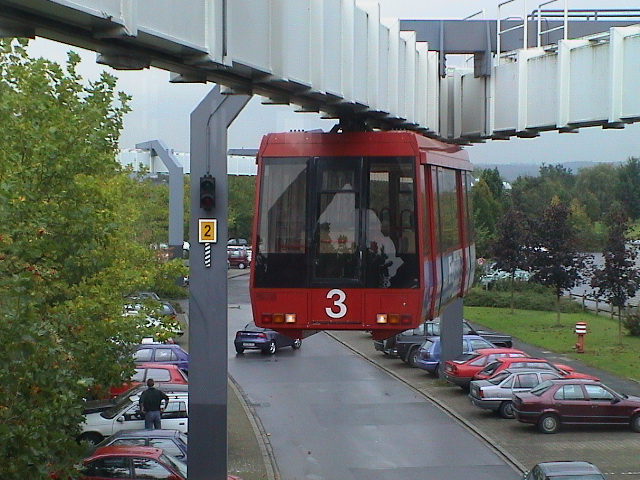
The H-Bahn for commuting inside University campus

Following the Zeitgeist of the late 1960s in Germany, the university was built "on the meadows" (auf der grünen Wiese) about 2 miles (3.2 km) outside of downtown Dortmund. It consists of two campuses, North and South, which, since 1984, have been linked by an automated hanging monorail system, the H-Bahn, that crosses the nature reserve between the campuses at a height of about 50 feet (15 m). One of the most prominent buildings of the university is the Mathetower (Mathematics Tower), which houses the Faculty of Mathematics.

== Faculties ==
1. Faculty of Mathematics
2. Faculty of Physics
3. Faculty of Chemistry and Chemical Biology
4. Faculty of Computer Science
5. Faculty of Statistics
6. Faculty of Biochemical and Chemical Engineering (BCI)
7. Faculty of Mechanical Engineering
8. Faculty of Electrical Engineering and Information Technology
9. Faculty of Spatial Planning
10. Faculty of Architecture and Civil Engineering
11. Faculty of Business and Economics
12. Faculty of Education, Psychology and Sociology
13. Faculty of Rehabilitation Sciences
14. Faculty of Human Sciences and Theology
15. Faculty of Cultural Studies
16. Faculty of Art and Sports Sciences
17. Faculty of Social Sciences

== Research ==
Over 1,000 third-party funded projects, including a range of collaborative projects, such as (transregional) Collaborative Research Centers, Research Units, Research Training Groups, a "Cluster of Excellence" and several Horizon 2020 research consortia. Nearly 300 professors teach and research at TU Dortmund University.

The university is particularly known for research in its four profile areas: Materials, Production Technology and Logistics, Chemical Biology, Drug Research and Process Engineering, Modeling, Data Analysis, Modeling and Simulation and Education, Schooling and Inclusion, in which it celebrates research successes beyond disciplinary limits, and at an outstanding international level.

== Faculty of Computer Science ==
TU Dortmund (along with the universities of Paderborn and Karlsruhe) brought the Internet to Germany in the 1980s.

The first point of registration for .de-domains was at the Dortmund University Department of Computer Science in 1986. The national Domain Name System service was started in 1988. The involvement of Dortmund University employees in internet registry and administration ended in 1993. To this day, the university has registered the domain udo.edu (udo being short for Universität Dortmund), although the .edu-domain is today restricted to United States-affiliated institutions.

One of the four German competency centers for machine learning (Competence Center Machine Learning Rhine-Ruhr, ML2R), is located at the TU Dortmund. The machine learning software RapidMiner began at the TU Dortmund's artificial intelligence unit.

== Rankings ==
University rankings

Overall – Global & National
QS World 2024	851–900	44
THE World 2024	401–500	37–41
ARWU World 2022	901–1000	46–47

In the QS World University Rankings for 2024, the university was positioned within the 851–900 range globally, making it the 44th at the national level. Its performance in the Times Higher Education World University Rankings was relatively higher for the year 2024, landing within the 401–500 bracket globally, and ranking between 37th and 41st nationally. In the Academic Ranking of World Universities (ARWU) for 2022, the university was categorized in the 901–1000 band globally, while nationally it fell within the 46th to 47th position.

The university is highly ranked in terms of its research performance in the areas of physics, electrical engineering, chemistry and economics.

== Honorary doctorates ==
Former president of Germany, Johannes Rau was awarded an honorary doctorate from the university in 2004. Carl Djerassi was awarded an honorary doctorate for his science-in-fiction in 2009. Donald Tusk, President of the European Council, was awarded an honorary doctorate on 16 December 2018 for his contribution to European politics and the debate on European values. Scholar Ed Folsom, University of Iowa, was awarded an honorary doctorate on 6 December 2023 for his work on Walt Whitman as well as his contribution to the Iowa–Dortmund academic partnership.

== See also ==
- ESDP-Network
- ConRuhr
