= Jürgen Hubbert =

German mechanical engineer (1939–2021)

- Born: 24 July 1939
- Died: 12 January 2021 (aged 81); Sindelfingen, Germany
- Other name: Mister Mercedes
- Citizenship: (Germany) German
- Education: University of Stuttgart
- Occupation: Engineer

Jürgen Hubbert (24 July 1939 – 12 January 2021) was a German mechanical engineer and executive. A member of Mercedes-Benz's Board of Management, he helped oversee the production of several Mercedes-Benz road cars and played a significant role in Mercedes-Benz's involvement in motorsport.

== Life and career ==
Hubbert was born in 1939 and studied at the University of Stuttgart, graduating in 1965 with a degree in engineering. In the same year, he joined what was then Daimler-Benz AG, where he worked in the process development department of the Sindelfingen plant in various technical and planning functions. He oversaw the introduction of the various Mercedes-Benz road cars, including the A-Class, the M-Class, the CLK-Class, and the smart branding. Hubbert later became a member of the company's Board of Management, and his work for the Mercedes-Benz earned him the nickname Mister Mercedes. In the early 1990s, Hubbert began teaching engineering at the University of Karlsruhe, with the university giving him an honorary academic citizenship in 2015.

Hubbert played a key role in Mercedes-Benz's operations in motorsport, such as DTM, CART, and the company's re-entry into Formula One. He was also an essential part in the engine partnership with McLaren which began in 1995 that resulted in multiple world championships.

In 2002, Hubbert became the President of the Grand Prix World Championship, a proposed company which wanted to establish its own Grand Prix series from 2008 in competition with Formula 1.

Hubbert died on 12 January 2021 in Sindelfingen, at the age of 81.
