= University of Duisburg-Essen =

University in Germany

- Universität Duisburg-Essen
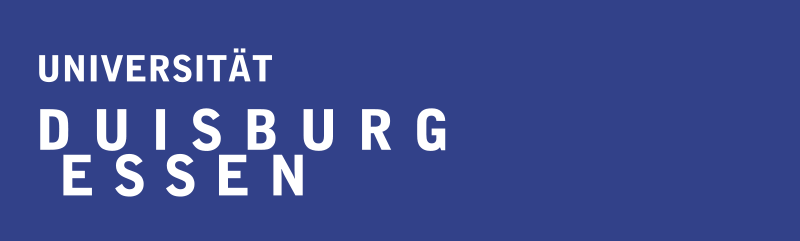
- Motto: Offen im Denken
- Motto in English: Open-minded
- Type: Public
- Established: 1654; 372 years ago re-established on 1 January 2003
- Affiliations: Aurora, UAMR – University Alliance Metropolis Ruhr, DAAD, DFG, IRUN
- Budget: EUR 483 million
- Chancellor: Rainer Ambrosy
- Rector: Barbara Albert
- Academic staff: 4,062
- Administrative staff: 1,581
- Students: 43,043 (2017)
- Location: Duisburg and Essen, NRW, Germany; 51°25′45″N 6°48′3″E
- Campus: 200 acres (81 ha); Urban/Suburban
- Colours: Blue and white
- Website: www.uni-due.de

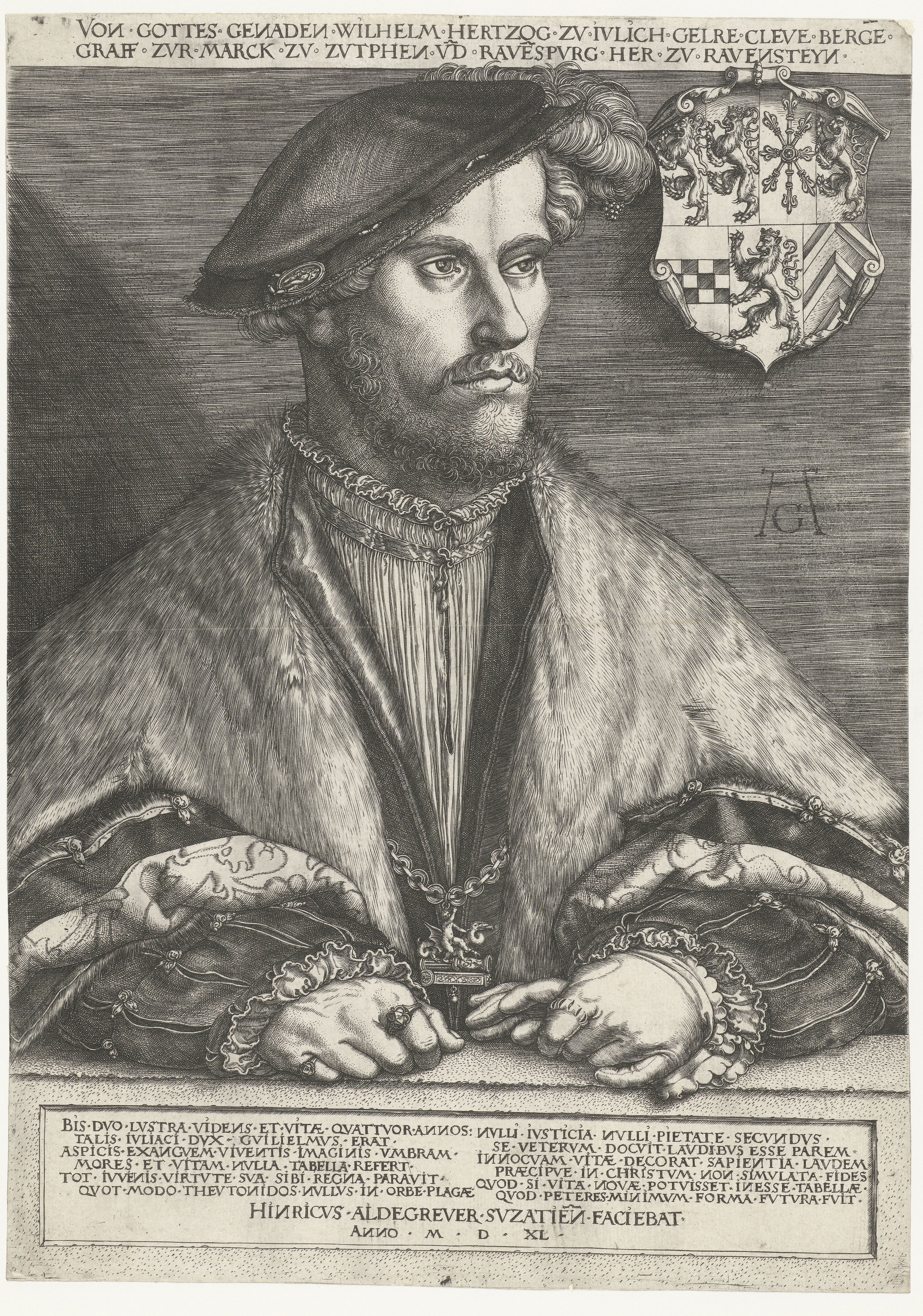
The Founder Duke of the United Duchies of Jülich-Cleves-Berg

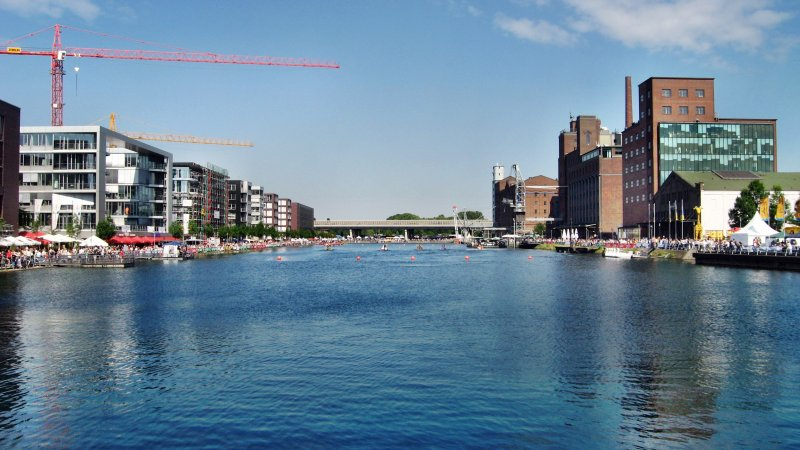
Duisburg City

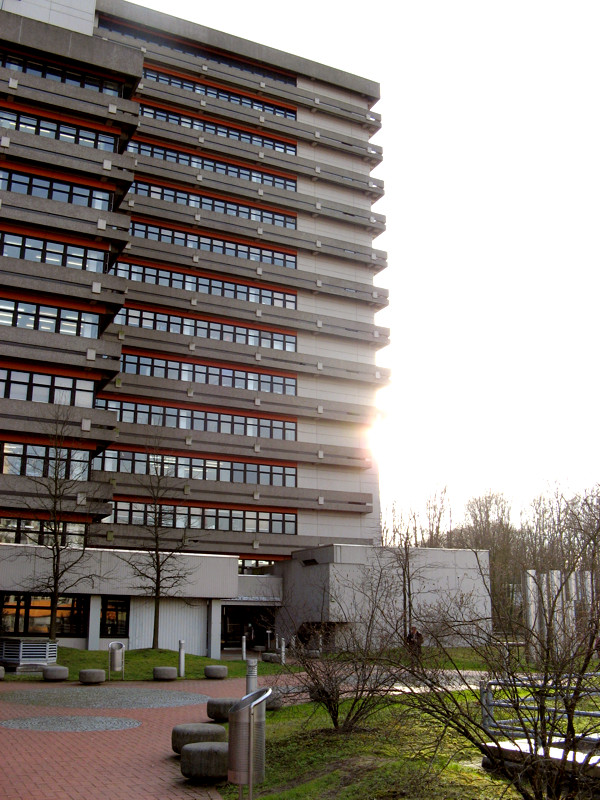
University

The University of Duisburg-Essen (German: Universität Duisburg-Essen) is a public research university in North Rhine-Westphalia, Germany. In the 2019 Times Higher Education World University Rankings, the university was awarded 194th place in the world. It was originally founded in 1654 and re-established on 1 January 2003, as a merger of the Gerhard Mercator University of Duisburg and the university of Essen. It is based in both the cities of Duisburg and Essen, and a part of University Alliance Metropolis Ruhr.

With its 12 departments and around 40,000 students, the University of Duisburg-Essen is among the 10 largest German universities. Since 2014, research income has risen by 150 percent. Natural science and engineering are ranked within the top 10 in Germany, and the humanities are within the top 20 to 30. Especially, the physics field is ranked in the top 1 in Germany.

== History ==
=== Origins: University of Duisburg (1555) ===
The university's origins date back to the 1555 decision of Duke Wilhelm V von Jülich-Kleve-Berg, to create a university for the unified duchies at the Lower Rhine. To this end, it was necessary to obtain a permission of the emperor and the pope. Although the permission of the pope was granted in 1564 and of the emperor in 1566, the university was founded about ninety years later in 1654, after the acquisition of the Duchy of Cleves by Frederick William, Elector of Brandenburg. It opened on 14 October 1655 by Johannes Claudberg as their first rector. The university had four faculties: Theology, Medicine, Law and Arts. During its period of activity it was one of the central and leading universities of the western provinces of Prussia.

Only a few decades later the university was in competition with the much better equipped Dutch universities. Since only about one third of the population in the western provinces of Prussia were member of The Reformed Church, most Lutheran and Catholic citizens in the second half of the 18th century sent their sons to other universities.

The university declined rapidly and was closed on 18 October 1818, due to a Cabinet Order of Friedrich Wilhelm III. At the same time, the University of Bonn was founded. Large parts of the Duisburg University Library were relocated to Bonn and formed the basis of the newly formed Bonn Library. The sceptre of the University of Duisburg was given to the University of Bonn, where it is still located today.

In 1891, the Rheinisch-Westfälische Hüttenschule was relocated from Bochum to Duisburg. Subsequently, the school was transformed into the Königlich-Preußischen Maschinenbau- und Hüttenschule, and in 1938 was renamed to Public School of Engineering.

After a decision of the federal state government in 1960, the teacher training college of Kettwig was settled to Duisburg and was named Pedagogical University Ruhr. In 1968, the university was founded again in Duisburg, related to the old one, bearing the name: Comprehensive University of Duisburg. Initially only small, the university was developed rapidly in the 1970s up to about 15,000 students. In 1972 the Pedagogical University Ruhr and the Public School of Engineering, which was renamed in 1971 to University of applied sciences Duisburg. Other schools were also relocated to Duisburg. The University of Duisburg was then called Comprehensive University of Duisburg. In 1994 the university was renamed Gerhard Mercator University.

In 2003, Gerhard Mercator University merged with the University of Essen to form the University of Duisburg-Essen, which is today one of the largest universities in Germany with about 40,000 students.

=== University of Essen (1972) ===
The university was founded in 1972 as the comprehensive university of the state of North Rhine-Westphalia. It was deliberately established – like other new institutions founded at the same time – as a measure within the framework of the structural transformation of the Ruhr region from a coal and steel center to a service center.

The University of Essen (also known as the University of Essen-GH ) was built as a complex of buildings around a green campus on the northern edge of the city center, on a previously demolished part of the traditional working-class district of Segeroth, now Essen-Nordviertel. By locating it near the city center and in a working-class district, and by distributing student dormitories throughout the city, the aim was to achieve close integration of academics into the urban population.

The University Hospital Essen, located in the Holsterhausen district, was integrated into the newly founded university. The Essen Municipal Hospitals, founded in 1909, were transformed into a state university hospital on 1 October 1963, with an eye toward university establishment plans for the Ruhr region. The hospital was temporarily assigned to the Westphalian Wilhelms University of Münster as its second medical faculty, and teaching began in the winter semester of 1963/64. In 1967, the hospital was transferred as planned to the recently founded Ruhr University Bochum. With the second wave of university foundings in 1972, it finally became a founding component of the University of Essen. Essen was thus the only one of the newly founded universities of the 1970s and the only city in the Ruhr region to have a university hospital.

In 1972, the design department of the Folkwang University of the Arts was transferred to the University of Essen. In 2007, the design department was transferred from the merged University of Duisburg-Essen back to the Folkwang University of the Arts, which was renamed in 2010. The facilities remained on the Essen campus until further notice.

The Essen University of Education in the Rüttenscheid district was also integrated, and its buildings continued to be used, as were the University of Applied Sciences for Mechanical Engineering on Schützenbahn and the University of Applied Sciences for Civil Engineering in the Moltkeviertel district. The Moltkestraße site is no longer used by the university; instead, it houses a vocational college run by the city of Essen. While the buildings of the former University of Education have since been vacated and demolished (the last structure to be demolished is currently the former university's indoor swimming pool; as of January 2022), the Schützenbahn site remains part of the merged university.

Many of the original reform concepts from the founding period did not take effect as intended for various reasons or were not implemented at the university. Over the decades, the institution evolved in most respects into a typical university. The most successful of the university-wide reform ideas is considered to be the opening of the university to graduates of second-chance education programmes, many thousands of whom earned university degrees in Essen alone – with comparable success to high school graduates, as demonstrated by accompanying academic research.

=== Merger and joint development ===
The merger of the two previously independent universities was initially proposed jointly to the state government by the two rectorates of the universities in order to pool resources and leverage synergies. However, the discussion about the path to restructuring was contentious. Discussions with the state government regarding the legal framework were also frequently contentious, but the University of Duisburg consistently supported the merger; the University of Essen rejected it in the final stages of the discussion. The merger was finally enacted by law on 18 December 2002, by the North Rhine-Westphalia state parliament, and Ministerial Director Heiner Kleffner was appointed as the founding commissioner. Lawsuits filed by the Essen rectorate against this law were dismissed by the Higher Administrative Court of Münster. During the founding phase of the new, merged university, there was intense debate about the allocation of subjects to the individual campuses.

The state government hoped that the merger would save costs and create larger departments at single locations by consolidating the range of subjects, with sufficient potential for specialization and effective participation in international scientific discourse. After the end of the founding phase, only one of the four major subject groups (humanities/social sciences, natural sciences, engineering, and medicine) is actually concentrated at one location:

Medicine remained at the Essen University Hospital. All teacher training programmes, with the exception of a few vocational specialisations, now take place in Essen, while departments such as physics have moved to Duisburg. According to a decision by the university governing bodies, however, sociology and political science still belong to the "Technical University" profile of the Duisburg campus; civil engineering, although part of the Faculty of Engineering whose programmes are primarily offered at the Duisburg campus, remains at the Essen campus. Furthermore, computer science and economics programmes continue to be offered concurrently at both campuses. Depending on their chosen combination of subjects, this may mean that students have to commute between the two locations; for this purpose, an hourly shuttle bus service has been established.

The university library is represented at both locations; its holdings are currently distributed across six specialized libraries.

The university formally has no registered office. During the merger, the state did not specify which city would become the university's headquarters. The university itself has also avoided designating a location since then. According to the Gelsenkirchen Administrative Court, in a case concerning tuition fees, no legal proceedings can be conducted against the university without a designated location, even though Essen was specified as the place of jurisdiction in the founding charter.

=== Recent developments ===
In March 2007 the three universities of Bochum, Dortmund and Duisburg-Essen founded the University Alliance Metropolis Ruhr, which now includes more than 120,00 students and 1,300 professors and is modelled after the University of California system.

In May 2018, the three members of the University Alliance Metropolis Ruhr launched the Research Academy Ruhr (RAR), an inter- and university overarching programme for the development and support of young scientists. The programme is funded by the State of North Rhine-Westfalia (NRW) and the Mercator Research Centre Ruhr (MERCUR) with €800,000 over the next four years and an additional €1 million being added by the three participating members of the University Alliance.

== Campus ==
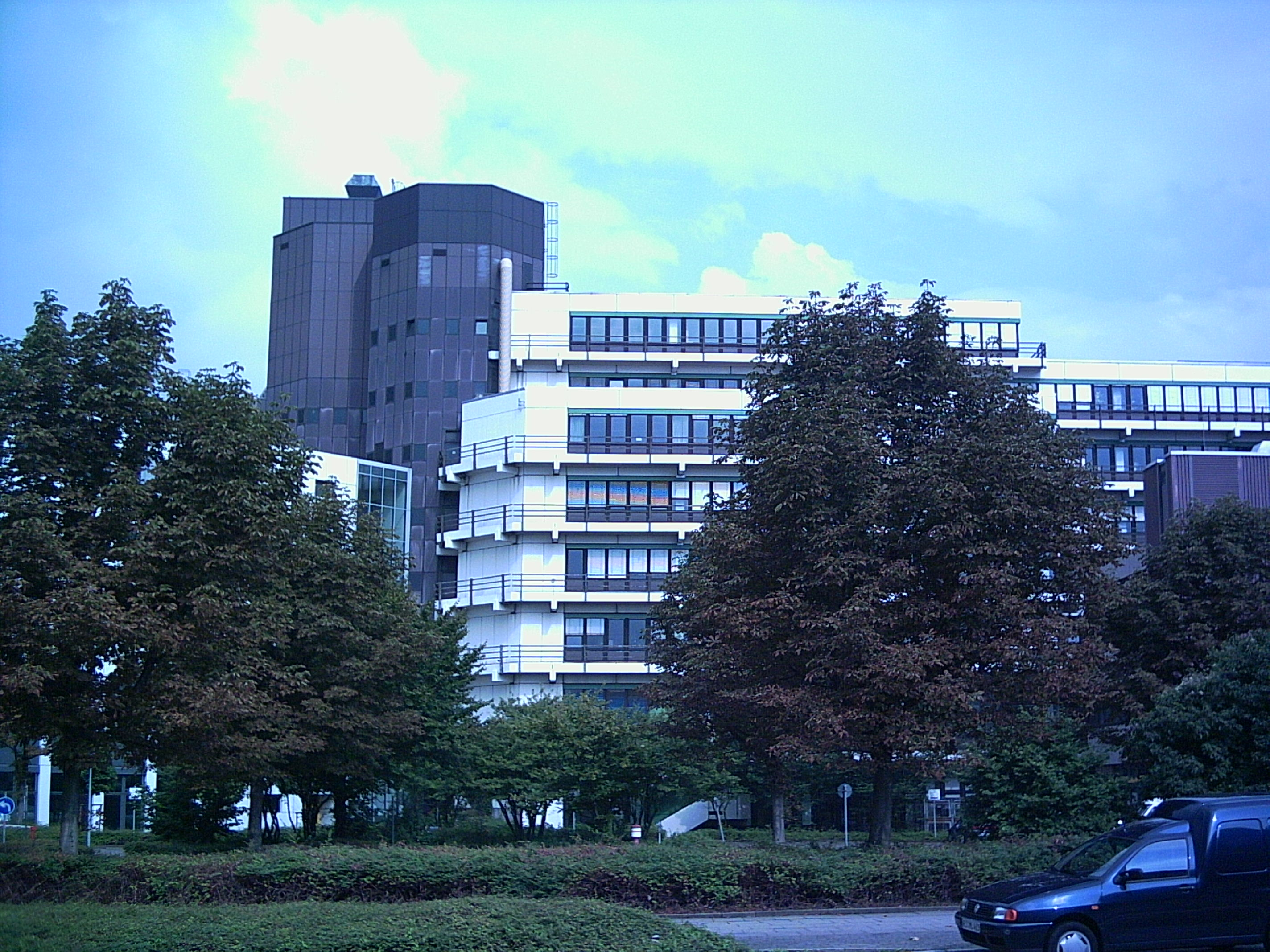
Campus location in Essen

The university has two main campus locations in Duisburg and Essen.

== Faculties and Institutes ==
=== Main faculties ===
The University of Duisburg-Essen today has twelve faculties, listed below:

- Faculty of Art and Design
- Faculty of Biology and Geography
- Faculty of Business Administration and Economics
  - Mercator School of Management – Faculty of Business Administration
- Faculty of Chemistry
- Faculty of Engineering
  - Department of Building sciences
  - Department of Electrical engineering and Information technology
  - Department of Computer sciences and Applied Cognitive Sciences
  - Department of Mechanical and Process engineering
  - Department of Transport Systems and Logistics
  - International Studies in Engineering
- Faculty of Humanities
- Faculty of Mathematics
- Faculty of Medicine and University Hospital Essen
- Faculty of Social sciences
  - Institute for Political Sciences
    - NRW School of Governance
  - Institute for Educational sciences
  - Institute for Development and Peace (INEF – Institut für Entwicklung und Frieden)
  - Institute for Sociology
- Faculty of Physics

=== Central scientific institutes ===
- Centre for Nanointegration Duisburg-Essen (CeNIDE) (German)
- German-French Institute for Automation and Robotics (IAR)
- Erwin L. Hahn Institute for Magnetic Resonance Imaging
- Essen College of Gender Studies (EKfG)
- Institute for Experimental Mathematics (IEM)
- Institute for Advanced Study in the Humanities
- Institute of East Asian Studies (IN-EAST)
- Institute for Labor/ Labour and Qualification (IAQ)
- Interdisciplinary center for analytics on the nanoscale (ICAN)
- Centre for Logistics and Transport (ZLV)
- Centre for Medical Biotechnology (ZMB)
- Centre for Water and Environmental Research (ZMU)
- Centre for empirical research in education (ZeB)
- Centre for Global Cooperation Research (CGCR)

==== The NRW School of Governance ====
The NRW School of Governance is a central institution within the Institute for Political science and was founded in 2006 under the direction of Karl-Rudolf Korte.

It aims, through research and teaching, to promote the scientifically sound understanding of political processes (in North Rhine-Westphalia).

It does so by educating and training students in three main programmes:

1. Masters programme: "Political management, Public policy and Public administration"
2. Part-time masters programme: "Public Policy"
3. Doctoral School: Scholarship and Excellence programmes at the Department of Political Science

and also through the use of various other education modules.

=== Associated institutes ===
- paluno, The Ruhr Institute for Software Technology
- German Textile Research Centre North-west (DTNW)
- Development Centre for Ship Technology and Transport Systems (DST)
- Asia-Pacific Economic Research Institute (FIP)
- Institute of Energy and Environmental Technology (IUTA)
- Institute for Labor/ Labour and Qualification (IAQ)
- Institute of Mobile and Satellite Communication Technology (IMST)
- Institute for Prevention and Health Promotion (IPG)
- Institute of Science and Ethics (IWE)
- IWW Water Centre (IWW)
- Rhine-Ruhr Institute for Social Research and Political Consulting (RISP)
- Salomon Ludwig Steinheim Institute for German-Jewish History (StI)
- Centre for Fuel Cell Technology (ZBT)

The university has a Confucius Institute.

== Student body ==
As of 2018 it is the German university with the largest number of Chinese international students. Overall, it has a 16% composition of international students. The majority of such students are enrolled as engineering or economics majors.

== People ==
=== Rectors ===
- January 2003 – September 2003 – Heiner Kleffner, Founding commissioner and head of section
- October 2003 – December 2006 – Lothar Zechlin, Founding rector
- January 2007 – March 2008 – Lothar Zechlin, 1. rector
- April 2008 – March 2022 – Ulrich Radtke, 2. rector
- April 2022 – Barbara Albert

=== Mercator-Professorship Award ===
The University of Duisburg-Essen awards the Mercator-Professur to individuals who are well known for their social and scientific engagement. So far, recipients of the Mercator-Professur have been:

- 1997: Hans-Dietrich Genscher, politician (FDP), former foreign minister and vice-chancellor of Germany
- 1998: Siegfried Lenz, writer
- 1999: Jan Philipp Reemtsma, literary scholar.
- 2000: Jutta Limbach, jurist and politician (SPD)
- 2001: Volker Schlöndorff, filmmaker.
- 2002: Ulrich Wickert, journalist, chief anchor for tagesthemen
- 2003: Daniel Goeudevert French writer, management consultant.
- 2004: Walter Kempowski, writer.
- 2005: Richard von Weizsäcker, politician (CDU), former President of the Federal Republic of Germany.
- 2006: Necla Kelek, social scientist
- 2007: Hanan Ashrawi, legislator, activist, and scholar
- 2008: Christiane Nüsslein-Volhard, biologist, winner of the Nobel Prize in Physiology or Medicine
- 2009: Peter Scholl-Latour, journalist and publicist
- 2010: Alice Schwarzer, publisher and feminist
- 2011: Udo Di Fabio, former judge of the Federal Constitutional Court
- 2012: Wolfgang Huber, bishop, former chairman of the Council of the Protestant Church in Germany
- 2013: Margarethe von Trotta, film director.
- 2015: Götz Werner, founder of dm-drogerie markt
- 2016: Karl Lehmann, cardinal prelate, former chairman of the Conference of the German Bishops
- 2017: Alfred Grosser
- 2018: Joachim Gauck
- 2021: Antje Boetius
- 2022: Ottmar Edenhofer
- 2023: Mai Thi Nguyen-Kim
- 2024: Carolin Emcke

Further professors include Jette Joop, Kai Krause and Bruce Ames.

=== Poets in residence ===
The institution of the poet in residence is not missing at any university in the US. In Germany, the University of Duisburg-Essen was the first and, for a long time, only university that followed the American example and brought contemporary authors to the university as guest lecturers for readings and seminars. In 1975, Martin Walser was the first poet in residence to hold his poetics lectures in Essen.

Since the summer semester 2000, the following personalities have worked as poet in residence at the University of Essen (later Duisburg-Essen):

- Ss 2000: Emine Sevgi Özdamar
- Ws 2000/01: Kirsten Boie
- Ss 2001: Volker Braun
- Ws 2001/02: Robert Gernhardt
- Ss 2002: Mike Nicol
- Ss 2003: Friedrich Christian Delius
- Ws 2003/04: Brigitte Burmeister
- Ss 2004: Georg Klein
- Ws 2004/05: Andreas Steinhöfel
- Ss 2005: Yōko Tawada
- Ws 2005/06: Dagmar Leupold
- Ss 2006: Friedrich Ani
- Ws 2006/07: Hans-Ulrich Treichel
- Ss 2007: Terézia Mora
- Ws 2007/08: Zafer Şenocak
- Ss 2008: Jürgen Lodemann
- Ws 2009/10: Klaus Händl
- Ws 2010/11: Judith Kuckart
- Ss 2011: Norbert Hummelt
- Ws 2011/12: Norbert Scheuer
- Ss 2012: Guy Helminger
- Ws 2012/13: Reinhard Jirgl
- Ss 2013: Antje Rávic Strubel
- Ws 2013/14: Bernhard Jaumann
- Ws 2014/15: Kathrin Röggla
- Ss 2015: Marion Poschmann
- Ws 2016/16: Klaus Modick
- Ss 2016: Lukas Bärfuss
- Ws 2016/17: Dorothee Elmiger, Reto Hänny
- Ss 2017: Christof Hamann
- Ws 2017/18: Jörg Albrecht, Kathrin Passig, Jonas Lüscher, Rainer Komers
- Ss 2018: Peter Wawerzinek
- Ws 2018/19: Peter Stamm
- Ss 2019: Esther Kinsky
- Ws 2019/20: Alida Bremer
- Ws 2020/21: Sabine Gruber
- Ss 2021: Micheal Roes
- Ws 2021/22: Nadja Küchenmeister, Lars Ruppel
- Ss 2022: Jan Wagner
- Ws 2022/23: Jacqueline Thör, Tobias Steinfeld, Morten Hübbe, Sandra da Vina
- Ss 2023: Natalka Sniadanko
- Ws 2023/24: Anja Kampmann
- Ss 2024: Caren Jeß
- Ws 2024/25: Christoph Peters

Earlier poets in residence (since the winter semester 1975/76) include Jurek Becker, Wilhelm Genazino, Günter Grass, Günter Herburger, Rolf Hochhuth, Heinar Kipphardt, Cees Nooteboom, Peter Rühmkorf, Martin Walser and Dieter Wellershoff.

== Academics ==
=== International cooperation ===
==== Erasmus programme ====
The university is part of the ERASMUS exchange programme.

==== International university cooperations ====
The university also cooperates with several other international institutions of higher education.

===== University of Duisburg-Essen (UDE)'s main partner universities =====
Country	Partner University	UDE Faculties
China	China University; of Mining and Technology	Engineering Humanities Physics
	Fudan University	Canter for Nanointegration Faculty of Medicine Mercator School of Management
	Huazhong University of Science and Technology	Canter for Nanointegration Faculty of Medicine and University Clinic Institute for East Asian Studies
Colombia	Universidad Nacional de Colombia	Faculty of Humanities Faculty of Social Sciences Faculty of Engineering
Japan	Kyushu University	Faculty of Engineering; Institute for East Asian Studies
Netherlands	Radboud University	Faculty of Humanities Faculty of Medicine and University Clinic Centre of Water and Environmental Research
Russian Federation	Lomonosov Moscow State University	Faculty of Chemistry Faculty of Physics Faculty of Biology and Geography

===== University of Duisburg-Essen (UDE)'s faculty partner institutions =====
Besides the main partnering universities, various faculty of the University Essen-Duisburg also cooperate with international universities and specific faculties or programmes (click "show" to expand).

Country	Partner University	UDE Faculties
Australia	Curtin University	Centre for Empirical Research in Education
	Griffith University	Faculty of Economics and Business Administration
	Macquarie University	Faculty of Humanities
Brazil	Santa Catarina State University	Department of Educational Sciences
	Universidade de Brasilia	Faculty of Engineering
	Universidade Estadual Paulista "Julio de Mesquita Filho"/ UNESP	Faculty of Engineering
	University of São Paulo	Faculty of Engineering
Canada	University of Waterloo	Center for Nanointegration Duisburg-Essen (CENIDE)
China	Beijing International Studies University	Faculty of Humanities
	Chu Hai College	Mercator School of Management
	Dalain University of Technology	Faculty of Engineering
	Hong Kong Baptist University	Mercator School of Management; Faculty of Physics
	Nankai University	Institute for East Asian Studies
	Renmin University of China	Institute for East Asian Studies
	Shanghai Medical College at Fudan University	Faculty of Medicine and University Clinic
	Southeast University	Faculty of Physics
	Sun Yat-sen University	Faculty of Medicine and University Clinic
	Tongji Medical College	Faculty of Medicine and University Clinic
	Tsinghua University	Faculty of Humanities
	Wuhan University	Institute for East Asian Studies
	Wuhan University of Technology	Faculty of Engineering
	Zhejiang University of Science and Technology	Faculty of Engineering
	Zhengzhou University	Faculty of Engineering
Colombia	Universidad Santo Tómas de Aquino	Faculty of Engineering
Egypt	Fayoum University	Centre for Water and Environmental Research (ZWU)
France	Institut Français du Pètrole (IFP-School)	Faculty of Engineering
	Champagne School of Management	Mercator School of Management
	Institut national des sciences appliquées de Lyon (INSA)	Faculty of Mathematics
Ghana	University of Ghana	Faculty of Social Sciences
India	Amity University	Centre for Water and Environmental Research (ZWU)
	Indian Institute of Technology Madras	Faculty of Engineering
Indonesia	Institute of Technology Bandung	Faculty of Engineering
	University of Indonesia	Faculty of Engineering
Israel	Tel Aviv University	Faculty of Humanities
Italy	Collegio Carlo Alberto	Faculty of Social Sciences
Japan	Chukyo University	Faculty of Humanities
	Dokkyo University	Institute for East Asian Studies
	Doshisha University	Mercator School of Management
	Fukuoka University	Institute for East Asian Studies
	German Institute for Japanese Studies	Institute for East Asian Studies
	Hokkaido University	Institute for East Asian Studies
	Japan Advanced Institute of Science and Technology	Faculty of Engineering
	Kanagawa University	Institute for East Asian Studies
	Kokugakuin University	Faculty of Humanities
	Nagoya University	Institute for East Asian Studies
	Ryukoku University	Institute for East Asian Studies
	Seinan Gakuin University	Institute for East Asian Studies
	Sophia University	Institute for East Asian Studies
	Tokyo University	Institute for East Asian Studies and Faculty of Social Sciences
	Tsukuba University	Center for Nanointegration Duisburg-Essen
	Yamagata University	Institute for East Asian Studies
	Yamanashi Gakuin University	Faculty of Social Sciences
Lithuania	Vilnius University	Faculty of Humanities
Luxembourg	University of Luxembourg	Faculty of Humanities
Malaysia	National University of Malaysia	Faculty of Engineering
	University of Malaysia Terengganu	Faculty of Mathematics
Mexico	University Iberoamericana	Faculty of Engineering
	Universidade LaSalle	Faculty of Engineering
Namibia	University of Namibia	Faculty of Humanities
Netherlands	University of Amsterdam	Faculty of Humanities
Palestinian territories	Palestine Polytechnic University	Faculty of Engineering
Peru	Pontificia Universidad Católica del Perú	Faculty of Engineering
Poland	Warsaw School of Economics	Mercator School of Management
Romania	The West University of Timisoara	Faculty of Educational Sciences
Russian Federation	Far-Eastern Federal University	Faculty of Humanities
	Far-Eastern State University of Humanities	Faculty of Humanities
	Immanuel Kant Baltic Federal University	Faculty of Physics
	The Linguistic University of Nizhny Novgorod	Faculty of Humanities
	Nizhny Novgorod State Medical Academy	Faculty of Medicine and University Clinic
	Nizhny Novgorod State University	Faculty of Educational Sciences
	Plekhanov Russian Academy of Economics	Mercator School of Management
Serbia	University of Novi Sad	Faculty of Chemistry
Singapore	Nanyang Technological University	Faculty of Engineering
South Africa	University of Pretoria	Faculty of Humanities
South Korea	Chung-Ang University	Faculty of Social Sciences Mercator School of Management Institute for East Asian Studies
	Chungnam National University	Faculty of Engineering
Taiwan	National Tsing Hua University	Faculty of Physics Faculty of Engineering
Ukraine	Donetsk National University	Faculty of Humanities
US	American University	Mercator School of Management
	Arkansas State University	Mercator School of Management
	Colorado State University	Faculty of Chemistry
	Colorado State University	Mercator School of Management
	Fort Hays State University	Faculty of Humanities
	Georgia Institute of Technology	Mercator School of Management
	Indiana University of Pennsylvania	Mercator School of Management
	Lehigh University	Mercator School of Management; Faculty of Social Sciences
	Mississippi State University	Mercator School of Management
	Tulane University	Faculty of Social Sciences
	University of Colorado	Mercator School of Management
	University of Illinois	Mercator School of Management
	University of North Carolina	Mercator School of Management
	University of Northern Iowa	Mercator School of Management
	Western Washington University	Mercator School of Management; Faculty of Social Sciences

==== University Alliance Metropolis Ruhr ====
As part of the University Alliance Metropolis Ruhr network the university is involved in running three liaison offices in Moscow, New York City and São Paulo. The offices aim to foster international academic exchange between the local and Ruhr area and are responsible for their respective continents.

==== International network ====
The university is also part of the AURORA Network of European universities.

==== Further cooperation programmes ====
The university is part of the IS:link (Information Systems Student Exchange Network), the VDAC (Verband der Deutsch-Amerikanischen Clubs / Federation of German-American Clubs e.V.) and offers the internationally oriented, doctoral programme "ARUS – Advanced Research in Urban Systems", which is based on previous academic achievements in selected fields within the Joint Centre "Urban Systems".

== Rankings ==
University rankings

Overall – Global & National
QS World 2024	771–780	42
THE World 2023	251–300	27–32
ARWU World 2023	301–400	20–24

In the QS World University Rankings for 2024, the institution placed between 771 and 780 globally, corresponding to the 42nd rank nationally. The Times Higher Education World University Rankings for 2023 positioned the university in the 251–300 bracket worldwide, and between 27th and 32nd place within the national context. The ARWU World ranking for 2023 listed the university within the 301–400 tier globally, and between the 20th and 24th rank nationally.

Measured by the number of top managers in the German economy, University of Duisburg-Essen ranked 15th in 2019.

In May 2018 the Centrum für Hochschulentwicklung (CHE – Center for Higher Education Development) rankings placed the university in the top ranks in different categories and fields, like the Physics department for seminar and lecture content and Biology, Computer Science, Math, Medicine and Sports for excellent programmes and support in the early stages of starting at Essen-Duisburg.

In the European Commission-funded U-Multirank system the university as a whole was ranked as "excellent" in the research categories "External research income", "Top cited publications", "Post-doc positions", in the knowledge transfer categories "Income from private sources", "Spin-offs" and "Publications cited in patents". In the category international orientation Essen-Duisburg was rated "excellent" for their "International academic staff".

== Notable people ==
=== Alumni ===
Notable alumni of the university include:

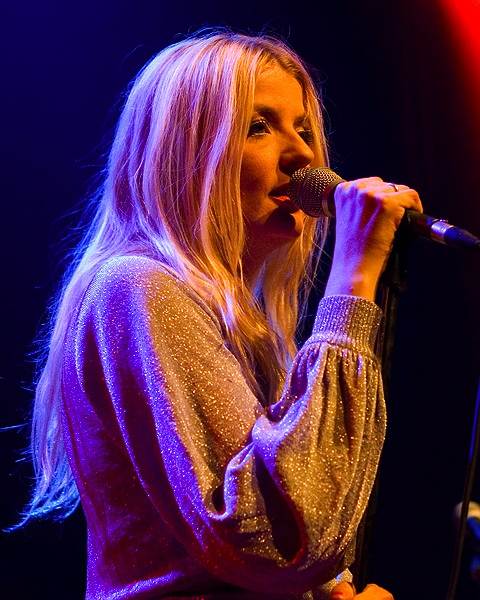
Suzie Kerstgens

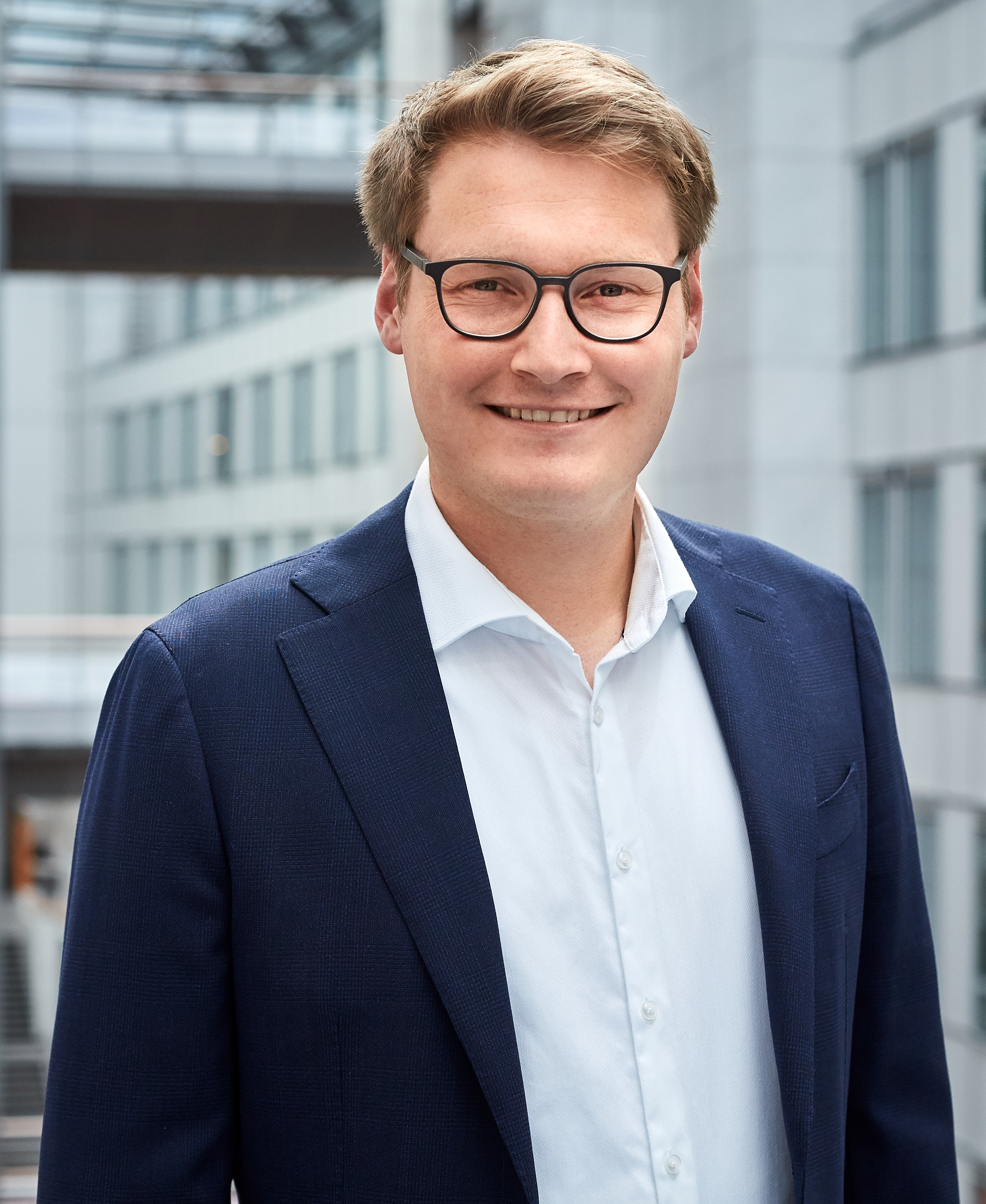
Moritz Körner

- Peter Bialobrzeski, photographer and a professor of photography
- Rainer Blasczyk, physician for transfusion medicine
- Cornelius Boersch, serial entrepreneur and business angel
- Osagie Ehanire, Nigerian medical doctor and politician
- Andreas Gursky, artist and photographer
- Ina Hartwig, writer, literature critic and academic lecturer
- Bärbel Höhn, politician
- Klaus-Dieter Hungenberg, chemist
- Petra Kammerevert, politician
- Suzie Kerstgens, singer
- Moritz Körner (born 1990), politician of the Free Democratic Party, Member of the European Parliament
- Hannelore Kraft, politician and Prime Minister of North Rhine-Westfalia (NRW)
- Heike Mauer, gender theorist
- Dieter Nuhr, cabaret artist
- Frank T. Rothaermel, American academic
- Peter Voswinckel, physician, medical historian and author
- Gorden Wagener, car designer, and is the chief design officer for Daimler AG

== Points of interest ==
- Botanischer Garten der Universität Duisburg-Essen, the university's botanical garden in Essen

== See also ==
- Official website
- ConRuhr
