= Rainer Blasczyk =

German physician

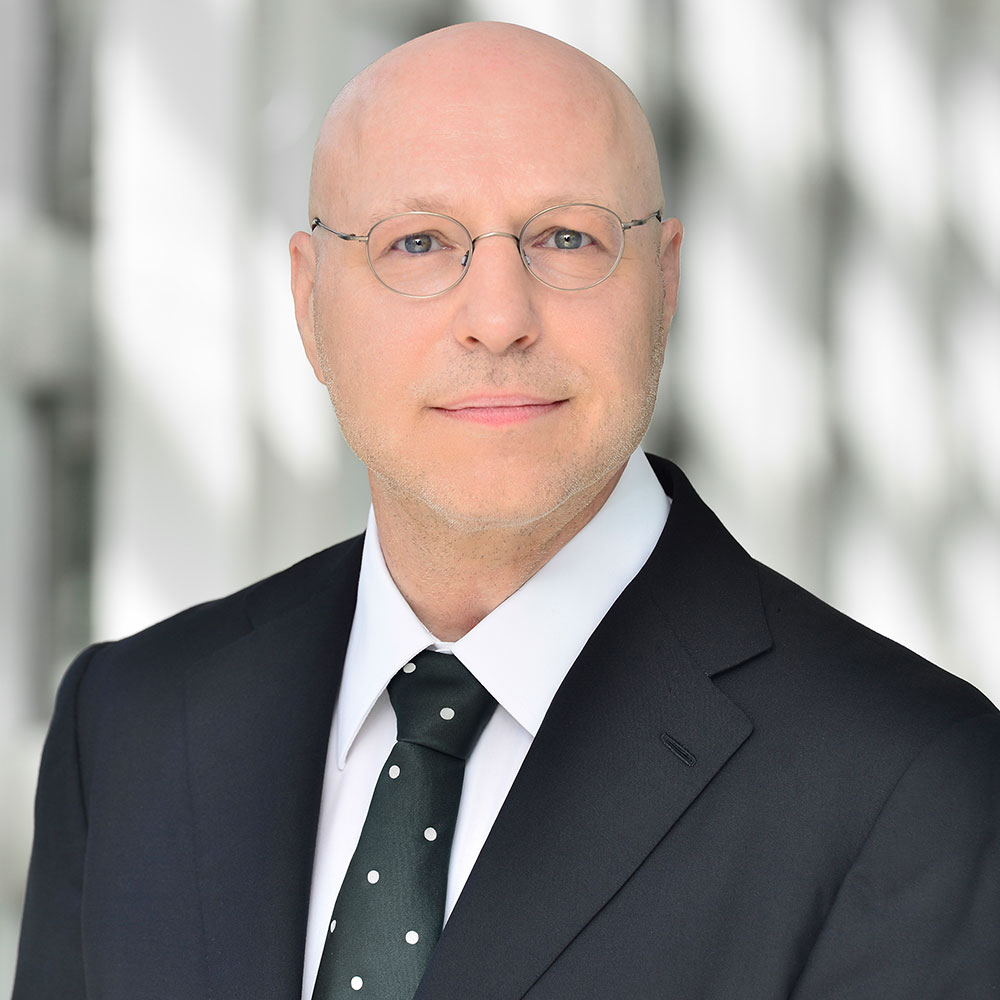
- Born: Rainer Blasczyk; January 8, 1962 (age 64); Germany
- Occupation: physician

Rainer Blasczyk (born January 8, 1962, in Castrop-Rauxel) is a German physician, university professor, entrepreneur and philanthropist. He specializes in transfusion medicine with a focus on transplantation and immunogenetics. He is considered a pioneer in genetic engineering of allografts to increase histocompatibility and prevent organ rejection after organ transplantation.

== Career ==
Blasczyk holds a professorship in the subject at Hannover Medical School and the directorship of the institute of transfusion medicine and transplant engineering since 1998. He graduated in medicine at the University of Essen in 1987 and began his clinical education as a junior clinician in abdominal surgery at the University of Marburg, where his interest in organ transplantation evolved. In 1988, he moved to the institute of immunology at the University of Essen, where he started to work in the field of histocompatibility and immunogenetics. From 1991 to 1993 he continued his clinical education in hematology and oncology at the University of Duesseldorf. Following these clinical years he returned to the field of immunology in 1993 at the institute of transfusion medicine, Humboldt-University of Berlin, where he started to work on molecular immunogenetics.

Blasczyk was president of the German Society for Immunogenetics (DGI) from 2006 to 2008 and 2012–2014, president of the German Society of Transfusion Medicine and Immunohematology (DGTI) from 2015 to 2016, served as a board member of the European Federation for Immunogenetics (EFI) from 2008 to 2010 and as transplantation specialist on its advisory board from 2009 to 2019. Blasczyk is editor of the journal Transfusion Medicine and was from 2006 to 2023 a member of the editorial board of the journal HLA. From 2016 to 2019, he has been an appointed member of the advisory board on Blood Products of the German Federal Ministry of Health. He is founder and board chairman of the German Foundation for Immunotherapy, which was established in 2005.

== Work ==
The scientific work of Blasczyk is focused on the alloimmune response in transplantation and strategies to combat organ rejection. He is founder and chairman of the scientific advisory board of Imusyn, a company dedicated to the development of recombinant proteins of polymorphic genetic systems used in immunodiagnostics. Together with Constanca Figueiredo, he initiated the research on transplant engineering by genetically modifying allografts during their inevitable ex vivo period after explantation in such a way that they become permanently invisible to the recipient's immune system and are prevented from rejection. He is co-founder of Allogenetics, a company dedicated to bringing this technology into clinical use.
