= Harold Addison Woodruff =

Australian pathologist and bacteriologist

- Born: July 10, 1877; Sheffield, Yorkshire, England
- Died: May 1, 1966 (aged 88)
- Education: Royal Veterinary College
- Occupations: veterinary pathologist, bacteriologist.

Harold Addison Woodruff (10 July 1877 – 1 May 1966) was an Australian veterinary pathologist and bacteriologist. He was born on 10 July 1877 in Sheffield, Yorkshire, England to Herbert Woodruff and Mary, née Addison. Raised as a Methodist, he remained actively involved in his faith, including attending to weekly prayer meetings for students at the University of Melbourne.

== Career ==
Woodruff was educated at Wesley College, Sheffield, England, and graduated at the Royal Veterinary College, London, England. He tutored in surgery there from 1898 to 1899 before becoming a professor in veterinary science and bacteriology at the Royal Agricultural University, Cirencester, Gloucestershire, United Kingdom. In 1900 to the Royal Veterinary College as a professor of materia medica and hygiene. From 1900 to 1908, he served chair of veterinary medicine and managed an extensive out-patient clinic. In 1912, Woodruff graduated with an English Conjoint License - M.R.C.S., L.R.C.P. and transferred to Australia as professor of veterinary pathology and director of the veterinary institute at the University of Melbourne.

== Military career ==
In October 1915, Woodruff joined the Australian Imperial Force as a major in the Australian Army Veterinary Corps (A.D.V.S. Third Division), serving in Egypt and France to fight World War I. He was permitted to return home in 1917 due to the decline of the veterinary school.

== Later years ==
At the age of 51 in 1928, Woodruff accepted a post as director of the bacteriology department at Melbourne University when the veterinary school finally closed. His efforts expanded the department, he influenced a number of notable scientists, and, most importantly, he established the Public Health Laboratories, now known as the Microbiological Diagnostic Unit at the Melbourne University. Throughout his career, he published a number of monographs, pamphlets and articles on veterinary medicine, medical issues, and theological issues. Woodruff delayed retirement until 1944 at the age of 57, but continued to be active in church activities, the peace movement, and music. In 1946, he was elected chairman of the Zoological Board of Victoria.

== Personal life ==
Woodruff married Margaret Ada, née Cooper, on 11 July 1908 in Finchley, Middlesex, England. She died in 1916. On 24 June 1919 Woodruff married Isabella Scott Scoular Glaister. After her death on 3 March 1954 Woodruff returned to Britain. He died on 1 May 1966 at the age of 89 in Edinburgh, Scotland. He was survived by his two sons from his first wife, Michael and Phillip.

== Works ==
- A Pure Milk Supply by H. A. Woodruff
- I.H.S., Jesus Saviour of Men by H. A. Woodruff
- Emmanuel - God With Us: A Study on the Incarnation by H. A. Woodruff
- If I Were a Jew by H. A. Woodruff / If I Were a Christian by H. M. Saenger and H. A. Woodruff
- This "Liquor Tyranny" by Professor H.A. Woodruff
- Education, What Part Shall the Church Play? by H. A. Woodruff
- Research and the Pastoral Industry, by T. Brailsford Robertson and H. A. Woodruff (1927).
- The Causation and Prevention of Puerperal Infection by R. Marshall Allan and H. A. Woodruff
- World Order or Anarchy? by H. A. Woodruff
