= Efavaleukin alfa =

Efavaleukin alfa is an experimental drug that works as an interleukin-2 "mutein Fc fusion protein that preferentially binds the high-affinity IL-2 receptor alpha chain (CD25) to selectively promote Treg expansion". It is developed to treat systemic lupus erythematosus (SLE).
