= Muromonab-CD3 =

Pharmaceutical drug

Monoclonal antibody
- Type: Whole antibody
- Source: Mouse
- Target: CD3

Clinical data
- Trade names: Orthoclone OKT3
- AHFS/Drugs.com: Consumer Drug Information
- MedlinePlus: a605011
- Routes of administration: Intravenous
- ATC code: L04AG01 (WHO)

Legal status
- Legal status: In general: ℞ (Prescription only)

Identifiers
- CAS Number: 140608-64-6
- DrugBank: DB00075
- ChemSpider: none
- UNII: JGA39ICE2V
- KEGG: D05092
- ChEMBL: ChEMBL1201608
- CompTox Dashboard (EPA): DTXSID2046414

Chemical and physical data
- Formula: C_{6460}H_{9946}N_{1720}O_{2043}S_{56}
- Molar mass: 146189.98 g·mol^{−1}

Muromonab-CD3 (brand name Orthoclone OKT3, marketed by Janssen-Cilag) is an immunosuppressant medication given to reduce acute rejection in people with organ transplants. It is a monoclonal antibody targeted at the CD3 receptor, a membrane protein on the surface of T cells. It is the first monoclonal antibody to be approved for clinical use in humans.

== Medical uses ==
Muromonab-CD3 is approved for the therapy of acute, glucocorticoid-resistant rejection of allogeneic kidney, heart, and liver transplants. Unlike the monoclonal antibodies basiliximab and daclizumab, it is not approved for prophylaxis of transplant rejection, although a 1996 review has found it to be safe for that purpose.

== Contraindications ==
Except under special circumstances, the drug is contraindicated for patients with an allergy against mouse proteins, as well as patients with uncompensated heart failure, uncontrolled arterial hypertension or epilepsy. It should not be used during pregnancy or lactation.

== Adverse effects ==
Especially during the first infusion, the binding of muromonab-CD3 to CD3 can activate T cells to release cytokines like tumor necrosis factor and interferon gamma. This cytokine release syndrome, or CRS, includes side effects like skin reactions, fatigue, fever, chills, myalgia, headaches, nausea and diarrhea, and could lead to life-threatening conditions like apnoea, cardiac arrest, and flash pulmonary edema. To minimize the risk of CRS and to offset some of the minor side effects patient experience, glucocorticoids (such as methylprednisolone), acetaminophen, and diphenhydramine are given before the infusion.

Other adverse effects include leucopenia, as well as an increased risk for severe infections and malignancies typical of immunosuppressive therapies. Neurological side effects like aseptic meningitis and encephalopathy have been observed. Possibly, they are also caused by the T cell activation.

Repeated application can result in tachyphylaxis (reduced effectiveness) due to the formation of anti-mouse antibodies in the patient, which accelerates elimination of the drug. It can also lead to an anaphylactic reaction against the mouse protein, which may be difficult to distinguish from a CRS.

== Pharmacology ==
T cells recognise antigens primarily via the T cell receptor (TCR). CD3 is one of the proteins that make up the TCR complex. The TCR transduces the signal for the T cell to proliferate and attack the antigen.

Muromonab-CD3 is a murine (mouse) monoclonal IgG2a antibody which was created using hybridoma technology. It binds to the T cell receptor-CD3-complex (specifically the CD3 epsilon chain) on the surface of circulating T cells, initially leading to an activation, but subsequently inducing the clearance of TCR complex from cell surface and apoptosis of the T cells. This protects the transplant against the T cells. When administered for transplant induction, the drug is administered daily thereafter for up to 7 days.

Newer monoclonal antibodies in development with the same mechanism of action include otelixizumab (also known as TRX4), teplizumab (also known as hOKT3γ1(Ala-Ala) ), visilizumab and foralumab. They are being investigated for the treatment of other conditions like Crohn's disease, ulcerative colitis, and type 1 diabetes.

== History ==
Muromonab-CD3 was approved by the U.S. Food and Drug Administration (FDA) in 1986, making it the first monoclonal antibody to be approved anywhere as a drug for humans. In the European Communities, it is the first drug to be approved under the directive 87/22/EWG, a precursor of the European Medicines Agency (EMA) centralised approval system in the European Union. This process included an assessment by the Committee for Proprietary Medicinal Products (CPMP, now CHMP), and a subsequent approval by the national health agencies; in Germany, for example, in 1988 by the Paul Ehrlich Institute in Frankfurt. However, the manufacturer of muromonab-CD3 has voluntarily withdrawn it from the United States market in 2010 due to numerous side-effects, better-tolerated alternatives and declining usage.

== Society and culture ==
=== Legal status ===
Orthoclone OKT3 was withdrawn from the US market in 2010.

=== Etymology ===
Muromonab-CD3 was developed before the WHO nomenclature of monoclonal antibodies took effect, and consequently its name does not follow this convention. Instead, it is a contraction from "murine monoclonal antibody targeting CD3".

== Research ==
It has also been investigated for use in treating T-cell acute lymphoblastic leukemia.
