= HLA-NET =

HLA-NET is a network targeted to the study of Human leukocyte antigen (HLA) from a populational point of view. The network was initiated by COST Action BM0803 in January 2009. Currently HLA-NET activities are being coordinated by a subcommittee of the scientific committee of the European Federation for Immunogenetics.

== The project ==
HLA-NET defined guidelines for the description of HLA typings concerning both the characterisation of the sample (including anthropological information) and the reporting of the typing data (including technical details to avoid misuse in the future). The guidelines also include rules for the validation of samples and suggests minimal requirements for data analysis. The HLA-NET portal provides an interface to software implementing these guidelines.

== HLA-NET guidelines ==
=== Population description ===
HLA-NET main recommendations for population characterization have been published. Most notably, outdated racial/ethnical and meaningless terms have to be replaced by an acceptable terminology to describe populations (i.e. geographical and cultural criteria). An electronic population questionnaire for field studies is available on the HLA-NET portal.

=== Obtaining and reporting data ===
HLA-NET defined standards for producing high quality data for HLA genotyping and proposed guidelines for reporting typing ambiguities. A best suitable format for optimal allelic and haplotypic HLA frequency estimations, based on the list of allele pairs that account for the genotyping information, has been published. Other formats that allow to express ambiguities without simplifying the data can also be used.

=== Validation of data sets ===
Samples are used to provide allele frequency estimates for populations. For HLA loci, the presence of ambiguities and that of putative recessive-like undetected alleles require the assumption of Hardy–Weinberg. HLA-NET explicitly requests that frequency estimates, for alleles or haplotypes, be validated by checking their conformity with Hardy–Weinberg expectations. If Hardy–Weinberg equilibrium is rejected then the frequencies can not be taken as representative of the population. The causes for deviation should be looked for and, if possible, addressed. In any case, non Hardy–Weinberg frequencies should never be used as valid population estimates.

== HLA-NET results ==
Besides the guidelines above, the HLA-NET network made contributions in the following areas:

=== HLA map of Europe ===
The most fine grained map of HLA distribution in the pan-European region is a result of cooperation with the AHPD – Analysis of HLA Populations Data – component of the International Histocompatibility Workshops. Besides the well-known pan-European gradients, originally reported by Cavalli-Sforza, local differentiations emerge, most notably the Alps appear as a genetic barrier to gene flow across Europe.

=== Usability of registry data ===
Registries have moderate to huge data sets, but the recruitment often is not performed in such a way that registry data can be considered as representative of the population. However, under certain conditions, it is possible to assess if a given registry might be used as a population sample or not. Undergoing work is being conducted to formalise the constraints and the procedures required to use registry data as a proxy to population samples.
