= Thymoglobulin =

Thymoglobulin (manufactured by Sanofi) is an anti-human thymocyte immunoglobulin (rATG) preparation made of purified polyclonal antibodies derived from rabbits. While these antibodies have a variety of specificities, their main mechanism of immunosuppression is through depletion of T cells. Thymoglobulin is currently approved for clinical use in Europe and the United States for renal allograft rejection, prevention of graft-vs.-host disease, and conditions involving bone marrow failure, including aplastic anemia and has additional off-label uses.

== History of antithymocyte globulin ==
Antithymocyte globulin (ATG) was originally developed as one of various tested preparations of anti-lymphocyte globulin (ALG) specifically generated to suppress human lymphocytes within the thymus (thymocytes). The purpose of this research was largely to produce an effective immunosuppressive agent safe for use in humans. Since the discovery of a link between antilymphocyte serum (ALS) and lymphocyte depletion by Metchnikoff in 1899, various studies have demonstrated the immunosuppressive ability of ALG and ATG. Experiments on ALS that confirmed its efficacy in lymphocyte depletion led to testing of different types of preparations including ALG, which were ALS produced against human lymphocytes, and ATG.

A number of studies conducted in the 1960s, including studies by Starzl et al. and Mathe et al., resulted in promising data for the clinical use of ALG for preserving short-term and long-term kidney function in patients immediately after human kidney transplantation. Use of equine ALG was also found to be efficacious in preventing acute graft-vs.-host-disease in patients’ post-allogeneic bone marrow transplantation. Experimentation with ALG and ATG preparations from different sources followed, leading to testing of ATG derived from rabbit serum. Thymoglobulin was the first commercial rabbit-derived ATG to be introduced in Europe and the US in the 1980s. Due to its demonstrated efficacy as an immunosuppressive agent, it remains a commonly used ATG for induction therapy and treatment of other associated conditions, such as graft-vs.-host disease and aplastic anemia.

== Mechanism of immunosuppression ==
As an rATG, thymoglobulin consists of polyclonal antibodies, which, unlike monoclonal antibodies, target a large variety of immune cell surface proteins, including B and T lymphocyte, natural killer cell, and plasma cell surface antigens. However, its efficacy as an immunosuppressive agent is primarily through rapid induced apoptosis of CD3+ T cells present in the bloodstream. Even at low levels of concentration (up to 1 ug/mL), rATG T-cell depletive ability is still sound, but higher concentrations of ATG can induce lysis of T lymphocytes through the classical complement pathway along with B cell and NK cell depletion as well . Thymoglobulin has also demonstrated the ability to induce expression of a number of regulatory cell markers in vitro, including CD25, GITR, and CTLA-4 (a.k.a. CD152, functions as immune checkpoint, downregulates immune response). Recent research has suggested that thymoglobulin may also contribute to T-cell anergy, in which T-cells remain inactive, though further research must be done to confirm this interaction.

== Clinical applications ==
Thymoglobulin is commonly used to prevent and treat acute rejection and increase graft survival in solid organ transplantation (SOT), especially kidney, liver, pancreas, and heart transplantation. As multiple studies have demonstrated both its efficacy and safety in a clinical setting, it is also used in different minimization regimens to reduce the application of higher risk immunosuppressive agents such as corticosteroids and calcineurin inhibitors (CNIs) in solid organ transplantation. Because both corticosteroids and CNIs have been found to potentially cause long-term adverse effects in the body, a multitude of studies have been conducted to examine the efficacy of thymoglobulin in SOT either with minimal usage or without the use of either agent. Findings have indicated that use of thymoglobulin alone minimizes risk of adverse effects and thus improves long-term outcomes for transplant patients.

Thymoglobulin is also an effective agent for preventing graft-vs.-host disease in patients receiving haematopoietic stem cell transplantation (HSCT). GVHD is a condition in which immune cells within the graft attack host cells and cause tissue damage. It is considered a major obstacle to successful HSCT. The T-cell depleting activity of thymoglobulin has proved to be useful in preventing GVHD.

Multiple studies have indicated that thymoglobulin is favored in comparison to other induction agents for patients who have increased risk of developing post-transplant complications, such as elderly patients, patients undergoing a repeat transplantation, and patients in which minimization of use of steroids or CNIs post-operation is recommended.
