= HLA (journal) =

- Discipline: Allergy, immunology
- Language: English
- Edited by: Steven GE Marsh

Publication details
- History: 1971–present
- Publisher: John Wiley & Sons on behalf of the European Federation for Immunogenetics
- Frequency: Monthly
- Impact factor: 8.0 (2022)

Standard abbreviations
- ISO 4: HLA

Indexing
- CODEN: TSANA2
- ISSN: 0001-2815 (print); 1399-0039 (web)
- LCCN: 72648617
- OCLC no.: 213527628

Links
- Journal homepage; Online access; Online archive

HLA (formerly known as Tissue Antigens) is a peer-reviewed scientific journal. It was established in 1971. It covers research on allergy and immunology. It is published monthly by John Wiley & Sons and is the official journal of the European Federation for Immunogenetics. In 2016 in changed its name from Tissue Antigens to HLA.
