= Transplant engineering =

Transplant engineering (or allograft engineering) is a variant of genetic organ engineering which comprises allograft, autograft and xenograft engineering. In allograft engineering the graft is substantially modified by altering its genetic composition. The genetic modification can be permanent or transient. The aim of modifying the allograft is usually the mitigation of immunological graft rejection.

== History ==
Transient genetic allograft engineering has been pioneered by Shaf Keshavjee and Marcelo Cypel at University Health Network in Toronto by adenoviral transduction for transgenic expression of the IL-10 gene. Permanent genetic allograft engineering has first been done by Rainer Blasczyk and Constanca Figueiredo at Hannover Medical School in Hanover by lentiviral transduction for knocking down MHC expression in pigs (lung) and rats (kidney).
