= Anti-lymphocyte globulin =

Immunosuppressive treatment

Anti-lymphocyte globulin (ALG) is an infusion of animal- antibodies against human T cells which is used in the treatment of acute rejection in organ transplantation. Its use was first reported by Thomas Starzl in 1966. Its use in transplant was supplanted by thymoglobulin between 1984 and 1999.

It has also been used in the treatment of aplastic anemia.

It is less commonly used than the similar anti-thymocyte globulin (ATG), and like ATG it is associated with cytokine release syndrome in the short term and an increased risk of post-transplant lymphoproliferative disorder in the long term. ALG is more likely to cause side effects than ATG, but is safer than OKT3.

The product was manufactured by Upjohn and Merieux, as well as the Schweizerisches Serum- und Impfinstitut in Bern, the latter of which was made by injecting horses with human thoracic duct lymphocytes and was called "Lymphoser Berna".
