= Post-transplant lymphoproliferative disorder =

- Other names: PTLD
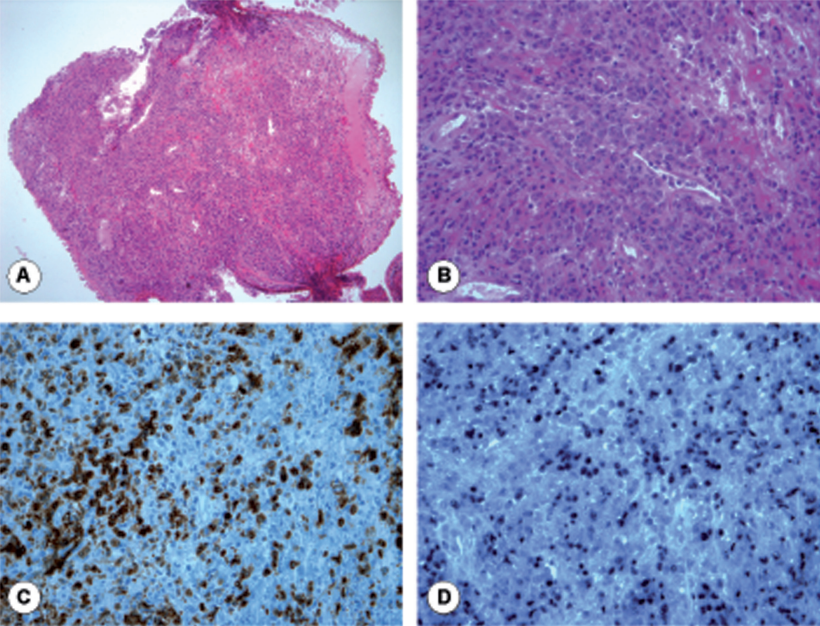
- Micrograph of a bronchial biopsy showing infiltrating lymphocytes infected by Epstein–Barr virus. HES stain.
- Specialty: Immunology

Post-transplant lymphoproliferative disorder (PTLD) is the name given to a B cell proliferation due to therapeutic immunosuppression after organ transplantation. These patients may develop infectious mononucleosis-like lesions or polyclonal polymorphic B-cell hyperplasia. Some of these B cells may undergo mutations which will render them malignant, giving rise to a lymphoma.

In some patients, the malignant cell clone can become the dominant proliferating cell type, leading to frank lymphoma, a group of B cell lymphomas occurring in immunosuppressed patients following organ transplant.

== Signs and symptoms ==
Symptoms of PTLD are highly variable and nonspecific, and may include fever, weight loss, night sweats, and fatigue. Symptoms may be similar to those seen in infectious mononucleosis (caused by EBV). Pain or discomfort may result from lymphadenopathy or mass effect from growing tumors. Dysfunction may occur in organs affected by PTLD. Lung or heart involvement may result in shortness of breath.

Laboratory findings may show abnormally low white blood cell, red cell counts, and platelet counts. In addition, serum uric acid and lactate dehydrogenase levels may be elevated, while serum calcium levels may be decreased. All of these findings together can suggest tumor lysis syndrome.

== Causes ==
The disease is an uncontrolled proliferation of B cell lymphocytes latently infected with Epstein–Barr virus (EBV). Production of an interleukin-10, an endogenous, pro-regulatory cytokine, has also been implicated.

In immunocompetent patients, Epstein-Barr virus can cause infectious mononucleosis in adolescents, which is otherwise asymptomatic in children during their childhood. However, in immunosuppressed transplant patients, the lack of T-cell immunosurveillance can lead to the proliferation of these EBV-infected B-lymphocytes.

However, calcineurin inhibitors (tacrolimus and ciclosporin), used as immunosuppressants in organ transplantation inhibit T cell function, and can prevent the control of the B cell proliferation.

Depletion of T cells by use of anti-T cell antibodies in the prevention or treatment of transplant rejection further increases the risk of developing post-transplant lymphoproliferative disorder. Such antibodies include ATG, ALG and OKT3 (muromonab-CD3).

Polyclonal PTLD may form tumor masses and present with symptoms due to a mass effect, e.g. symptoms of bowel obstruction. Monoclonal forms of PTLD tend to form a disseminated malignant lymphoma.

== Diagnosis ==
Definitive diagnosis is achieved by biopsying the involved tissue, which will reveal lymphoproliferative neoplasia. Most lesions will show malignant B cells, whereas a minority will show T cell neoplasia. CT imaging may show enlarged lymph nodes or a focal mass. PET scan may be helpful in the evaluation, which may show an increase in metabolic activity (PET avid) lesion, potentially guiding decisions on where to direct biopsies.

Neurologic symptoms, such as confusion or focal weakness, which may suggest involvement of the nervous system. This may be evaluated with an MRI of the brain with gadolinium based contrast and lumbar spinal tap with testing of the cerebral spinal fluid for EBV viral levels.

The presence of respiratory symptoms, such as cough or shortness of breath, in the setting of immunosuppression may suggest infection. Opportunistic infections may present in a similar fashion to PTLD. Evaluation with sputum culture for bacteria, Pneumocystis carinii, and acid fast bacilli, and fungal infections are often helpful.

== Treatment ==
PTLD may spontaneously regress on reduction or cessation of immunosuppressant medication, and can also be treated with addition of anti-viral therapy. In some cases it will progress to non-Hodgkin's lymphoma and may be fatal. A phase 2 study of adoptively transferred EBV-specific T cells demonstrated high efficacy with minimal toxicity.

PTLD exhibits tissue that is effaced by morphologically homogenous clonal proliferation of B, T, or NK cells with a malignant phenotype . Preventive treatment options for PTLD development require EBV DNA-level monitoring through bloodwork if the EBV level. Based on elevated EBV values, reducing immunosuppressants is recommended, and prophylactic rituximab should be considered if EBV fails to respond to immunosuppression. Prophylactic rituximab is successful as a treatment option in low dosages to effectively and safely reduce EBV viremia. Another important consideration in treatment is the histologic subtype of PTLD; if it is non-destructive polymorphic lesions that have indolent behavior do not require aggressive treatment, while other malignant PTLDs are often treated similarly to their analogous lymphoma.

== Epidemiology ==
PTLD is the second most common malignancy that occurs as a complication following solid organ transplantation (skin cancer is the most common). Less commonly, PTLD occurs after hematopoietic stem cell transplantation. The incidence varies by the type of transplantation: the lowest rates are seen with bone marrow transplants and liver transplants. The highest rates of PTLD are seen with lung and heart transplants, which is primarily due to the need for higher levels of immunosuppression. The incidence of PTLD is highest in the first year after transplantation; roughly 80 percent of cases after transplant occur in the first year. Transplantation of unmatched or mismatched HLA bone marrow also increase the risk of PTLD.

The main risk factors for PTLD are the degree of immune suppression and the presence of Epstein-Barr virus. Specifically, higher levels of T cell immunosuppression increase the risk PTLD. Individuals who have never been infected by the Epstein-Barr virus (EBV negative) who receive an organ from a donor with prior EBV infection are 24 times more likely to develop PTLD. Similarly, CMV mismatching (with a CMV negative recipient from a CMV positive donor) increases the risk of PTLD.
