= Geoffrey Duncan Chisholm =

British urologist (1931–1994)

Geoffrey Duncan Chisholm CBE, FRCS, MRCS
- Born: 30 September 1931; Hāwera, New Zealand
- Died: 11 November 1994 (aged 63)
- Education: University of St Andrews

Geoffrey Duncan Chisholm, CBE, FRCS, MRCS (30 September 1931 – 10 November 1994) was a New Zealand-born, British urologist. He made extensive advances in renal x-rays. He was also a strong advocate of kidney transplants, promoting the advantages of live donors.

== Life ==
Chisholm was born of Scots descent in Hāwera in New Zealand, on 30 September 1931, the son of Ellen Marion Friston and Sedman Arthur Chisholm, manager of the New Zealand Meat Board.

Chisholm was educated first at Scots College, Wellington and then went to the UK with his parents to live in London around 1946, and completed his studies at Malvern College. Chisholm then received a place at the University of St Andrews graduating with an MB ChB in 1955. As a medical student this also included much time at the Medical School in Dundee.

Chisholm returned to London soon after graduating and began specialising in urological subjects with a strong academic component. In 1961, Chisholm began a three-year period of work and study in the US, under a Medical Foundation Travelling Fellowship, beginning at the Brady Urological Institute and then moving to Johns Hopkins Hospital in Baltimore before finally ending in the White Memorial Hospital in Los Angeles. Here he learned further specialisation on surgery concerning the prostate.

On returning to the UK, Chisholm took up the post of Consultant Urologist at Hammersmith Hospital. In 1972, Chisholm returned to Scotland as a lecturer the University of Edinburgh, becoming a full Professorship in 1977, replacing the recently retired Sir Michael Woodruff. He also began surgery at Edinburgh's Western General Hospital.

In 1979 Chisholm was elected a member of the Harveian Society of Edinburgh and served as President in 1992.

In 1988, Chisholm was elected President of the Royal College of Surgeons of Edinburgh. He was appointed a Commander of the Most Excellent Order of the British Empire (CBE) in the 1992 Birthday Honours. In 1994 he was elected a Fellow of the Royal Society of Edinburgh, his main proposer being Sir Michael Woodruff.

Chisholm died of a tumour in Edinburgh on 10 November 1994.

== Publications ==
Chisholm was editor of the British Journal of Urology from 1977 and also editor of the Proceedings of the Royal Society of Medicine.

- Scientific Foundations of Urology (three editions)
- Clinical Practice in Urology
- Tutorials in Postgraduate Medicine (Urology)

== Family ==
He married Angela Jane Holden in 1962. He had met her in Hammersmith when she was working as a biochemist in the Department of Surgery.

== Artistic recognition ==
Chisholm portrait, painted in 1959 by Victoria Crowe, hangs in the Royal College of Surgeons of Edinburgh.
