= Australian Army Veterinary Corps =

Former administrative corps of the Australian Army (1909–1946)

- Active: 1909–1946
- Country: Australia
- Branch: Army
- Role: Veterinary medicine
- Engagements: First World War; Second World War

Insignia
- Abbreviation: AAVC

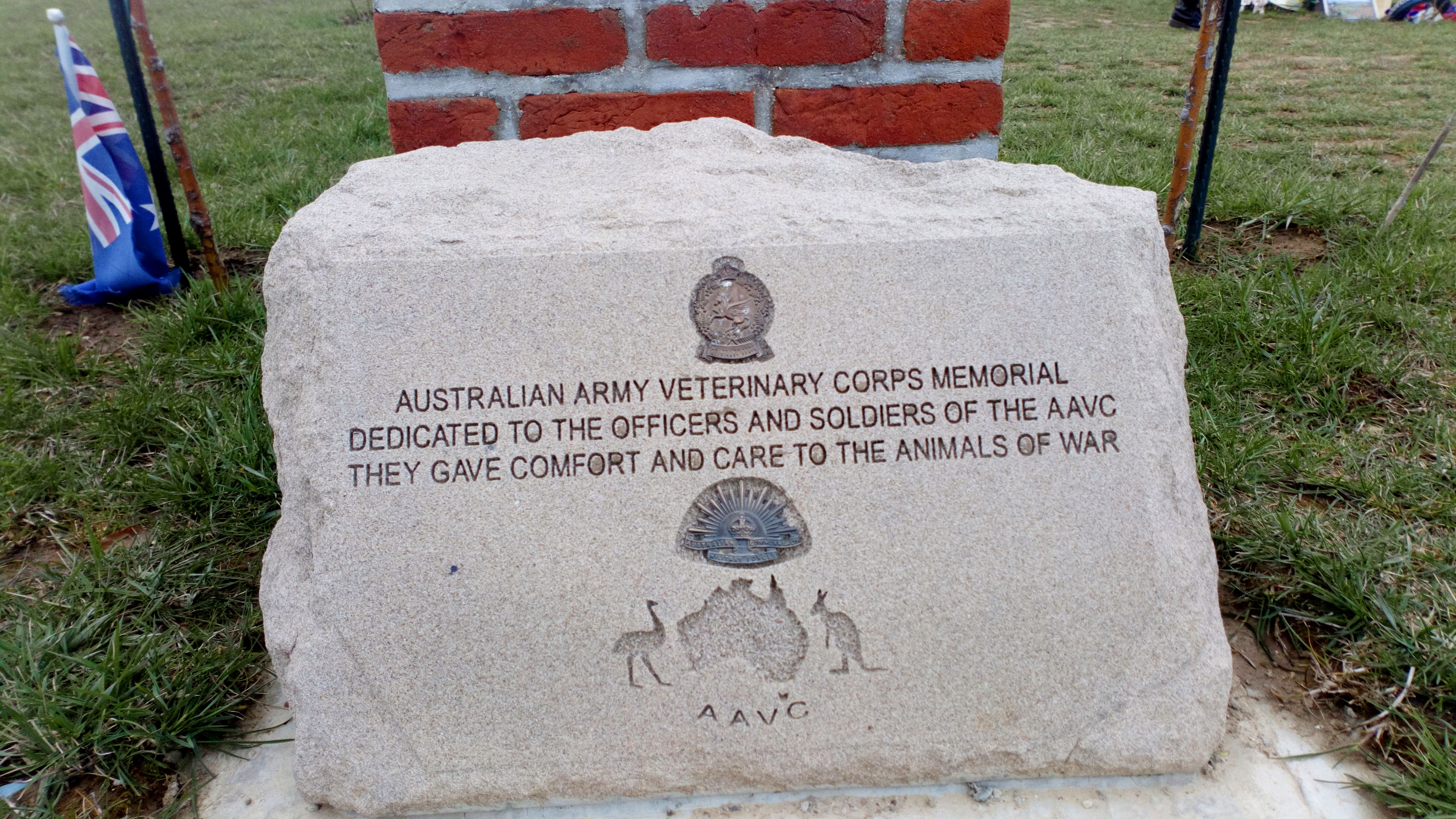
Memorial

The Australian Army Veterinary Corps (AAVC) was a corps of the Australian Army which was formed in 1909 to replace the veterinary department of the Commonwealth Military Forces. Following the establishment of a number of permanent artillery batteries and a remount department to supply them with horses, a permanent section of the AAVC was formed in 1911. Responsibilities included veterinary care of horses and the training of farriers and non-commissioned officers in shoeing, horse care and veterinary first aid. During the First World War 120 officers of the AAVC served overseas with the Australian Imperial Force. However, due to the effect of mechanisation there was only a limited role for specialised veterinary services during the Second World War. The corps was disbanded in 1946.

Current veterinary services within the Australian Army are provided by members of the Royal Australian Army Medical Corps.
