= IL2RA =

Protein found in humans

Identifiers
- Aliases: IL2RA, CD25, IDDM10, IL2R, TCGFR, p55, IMD41, interleukin 2 receptor subunit alpha
- External IDs: OMIM: 147730; MGI: 96549; GeneCards: IL2RA
Available structures
PDB	Ortholog search: PDBe RCSB
PDB	List of PDB id codes 1Z92, 2B5I, 2ERJ, 3IU3, 3NFP

Gene location (Human)
Chr.	Chromosome 10 (human)
Band	10p15.1	Start	6,010,689 bp
Band	10p15.1	End	6,062,370 bp

Gene location (Mouse)
Chr.	Chromosome 2 (mouse)
Band	2 A1|2 8.91 cM	Start	11,647,618 bp
Band	2 A1|2 8.91 cM	End	11,698,004 bp
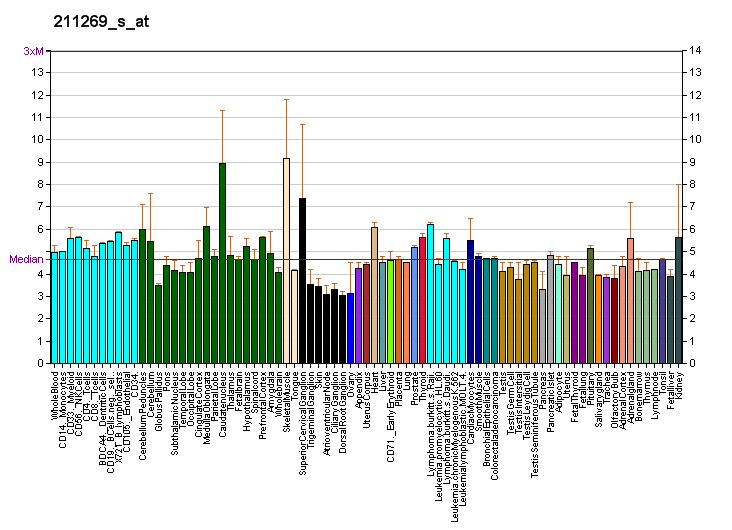

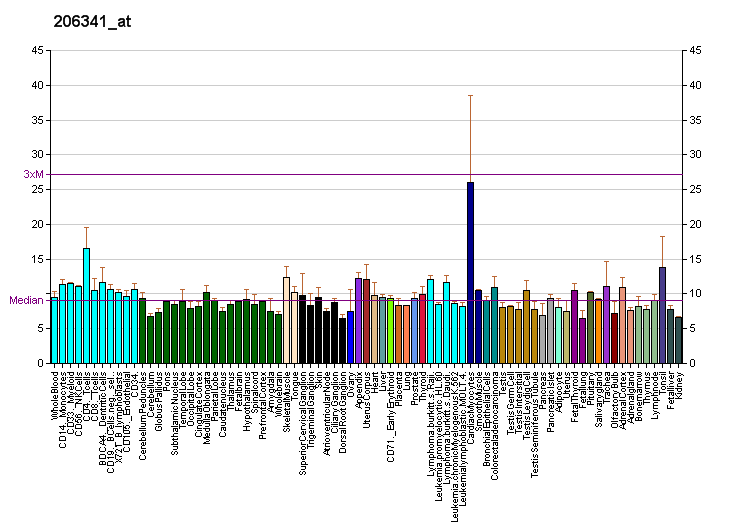
RNA expression pattern
Bgee	Human / Mouse (ortholog); Top expressed in: lymph node; appendix; spleen; buccal mucosa cell; gallbladder; blood; granulocyte; epithelium of colon; smooth muscle tissue; tonsil / Top expressed in: thymus; zygote; secondary oocyte; granulocyte; lymph node; muscle of thigh; blood; primary oocyte; sternocleidomastoid muscle; esophagus; More reference expression data
BioGPS	More reference expression data
Gene ontology
Molecular function	interleukin-2 receptor activity; interleukin-2 binding; protein binding
Cellular component	integral component of membrane; membrane; plasma membrane; cell surface; external side of plasma membrane; intracellular anatomical structure; interleukin-2 receptor complex
Biological process	Notch signaling pathway; positive regulation of T cell differentiation; regulation of T cell tolerance induction; inflammatory response to antigenic stimulus; negative regulation of defense response to virus; immune system process; activation-induced cell death of T cells; negative regulation of lymphocyte proliferation; MAPK cascade; T cell homeostasis; regulation of T cell homeostatic proliferation; cell surface receptor signaling pathway; negative regulation of T cell proliferation; negative regulation of immune response; immune response; positive regulation of T cell proliferation; cell population proliferation; inflammatory response; negative regulation of inflammatory response; positive regulation of activated T cell proliferation; apoptotic process; regulation of regulatory T cell differentiation; cytokine-mediated signaling pathway; interleukin-2-mediated signaling pathway
Sources:Amigo / QuickGO
Orthologs
Databases	NCBI: entry; OMA: entry
Species	Human	Mouse
Entrez	3559	16184
Ensembl	ENSG00000134460	ENSMUSG00000026770
UniProt	P01589	P01590
RefSeq (mRNA)	NM_000417; NM_001308242; NM_001308243	NM_008367
RefSeq (protein)	NP_000408; NP_001295171; NP_001295172	NP_032393
Location (UCSC)	Chr 10: 6.01 – 6.06 Mb	Chr 2: 11.65 – 11.7 Mb
PubMed search
- Wikidata
View/Edit Human	View/Edit Mouse

The interleukin-2 receptor alpha chain (also called Tac antigen, P55, and mainly CD25) is a protein involved in the assembly of the high-affinity interleukin-2 receptor, consisting of alpha (IL2RA), beta (IL2RB) and the common gamma chain (IL2RG). As the name indicates, this receptor interacts with interleukin-2, a pleiotropic cytokine which plays an important role in immune homeostasis.

== Genetics ==
The human protein interleukin-2 receptor subunit alpha is encoded by a gene called IL2RA with a length around 51.6 kb. Alternative names for this protein-coding gene are IL2R, IDDM10 and TCGFR. The location of IL2RA in the human genome is on the short arm of the 10th chromosome (10p15.1).

Several frequent point mutations, single nucleotide polymorphism (SNP), have been identified in or in close proximity to the IL2RA gene in the population. These SNPs have been linked mainly to susceptibility to immune dysregulation disorders, with the majority found in research on multiple sclerosis (MS) and type 1 diabetes mellitus.

IL2RA gene orthologues with identical protein functionality are relatively abundant and constant among animal species, especially in mammals subgroups. Moreover, conserved homologs of this gene are in mouse, rat, dog, cow, chimpanzee, and Rhesus monkey.

== Expression ==
CD25 is expressed broadly among leukocytes. The highest surface expression of this protein is on regulatory T cells (Tregs), where CD25 is expressed constitutively, especially on a subset classified as naturally occurring Tregs. It can also be found on activated B cells, NK (natural killer) cells, thymocytes, and some myeloid lineage cells (e.g., macrophages, dendritic cells). IL2RA has been used as a marker to identify CD4+FoxP3+ regulatory T cells mice. However, there are species differences as CD25 is constitutively expressed by a large proportion of resting memory T cells non-regulatory CD4 T cells in humans that are absent in mice. High expression of CD25 is also found on TCR activated conventional T cells (both CD8+ and CD4+ T lymphocytes), where it is considered to be a marker of T cell activation. Additionally, expression of the IL-2 receptor alpha subunit can be found in non-lymphoid tissues such as lungs (alveolar macrophages), liver (Kupffer cells) and skin (Langerhans cells).

IL2RA protein can be expressed in many types of neoplastic cells, such as in most B-cell neoplasms, T-cell lymphomas, some acute nonlymphocytic leukemias, neuroblastomas, mastocytosis, Waldenstrom macroglobuliaemia and tumor infiltrating lymphocytes.

== Structure ==
Interleukin-2 receptor alpha chain is an integral-membrane protein, more precisely a type I transmembrane protein. This bitopic polypeptide is constructed by a sequence of 272 amino acids and has a molecular mass of around 30.8 kDa. CD25 consists of three domains: extracellular (N-terminus), transmembrane (alpha-helix), and cytoplasmic (C-terminus). However, while the extracellular part is able to function as a binding site for interleukin-2, short cytoplasmic domain lacks an ability to induce intracellular signalling and therefore needs to oligomerise with other IL-2 receptor subunits. The interleukin-2 (IL2) receptor alpha (IL2RA) and beta (IL2RB) chains, together with the common gamma chain (IL2RG), constitute the high-affinity IL-2 receptor complex (Kd ~10−11M). Homodimeric alpha chains (IL2RA) result in a low-affinity receptor (Kd ~10−8M) with no signalling ability, while dimeric beta (IL2RB) and gamma chains (IL2RG) produce a medium-affinity receptor (Kd ~10−9M). Moreover, CD25 is an exclusive subunit that entirely binds IL-2, while CD132 binds the shared γc family cytokines (IL-4, IL-7, IL-9, IL-15 and IL-21), and the CD122 subunit also binds IL-15.

Soluble IL2RA has been isolated and determined to result from extracellular proteolysis during activation of T lymphocytes. Also, alternatively spliced IL2RA mRNAs have been isolated, but the significance of each is currently unknown.

== Signalling cascade of interleukin-2 receptor ==
Interleukin-2 can interact with the intermediate-affinity dimeric IL-2 receptor, which consists of beta (CD122) and gamma (CD132) chains, or with high-affinity trimeric complex, where the addition of an alpha subunit (CD25) constructs the IL-2 receptor and provides enhanced specific binding force. After activation of the receptor by its ligand, heterodimerisation of beta and gamma intracellular domains takes place. This coupling of subunits brings together Janus kinases JAK1 and JAK3, considering their association with respective cytoplasmic parts of beta and gamma subunits.

Downstream phosphorylation leads to the initiation of three signalling pathways: JAK-STAT pathway, PI3K/Akt/mTOR pathway and Ras/Raf/MEK/ERK (MAPK) pathway. Regarding JAK-STAT pathway, particular signal transducers and activators of transcription participate in this signalling cascade, namely STAT5, STAT1 and STAT3. After dimerisation, they translocate to the nucleus to perform transcription factor functions. All three signalling pathways are important for diverse cellular regulations, in terms of increased survival (anti-apoptotic effect), proliferation and cell growth, transcriptional regulation and cell differentiation.

T lymphocytes are influenced by IL-2R signalling in the case of CD4+ T helper subtype differentiation, promoting Th1, Th2, Th9, Tfr (T follicular regulatory cells) and suppressing Th17, Tfh ( T follicular helper cells). Additionally, strength of IL-2R signalling in CD8+ T cytotoxic lymphocytes may be connected to the phenotypic fate of these cells for effector and memory T cell formation.

== Clinical significance ==
Roifman's group was the first to identify immunological consequences of CD25 loss, and the patient has suffered from chronic infections and severe autoimmunity resembling Immune dysregulation, Polyendocrinopathy, Enteropathy X-linked (IPEX) syndrome, caused by mutations in FOXP3 gene.

=== CD25 as a biomarker ===
Levels of CD25 soluble form, called sIL-2Rα, have been connected to pathogenesis of autoimmune diseases and cancer. Since sCD25 is produced during immune activation, it is used as one of the biomarkers to track disease progression and to indicate outcome for clinical disorders. Especially, it is a hallmark for hyperactivated immune system and cytokine storm, which may lead to multiple organ system failure. In cancer, increased levels of this soluble protein are a diagnostic marker for leukemia and lymphoma. Furthermore, sIL-2Rα levels have some significance also in infectious diseases and transplantation. Higher serum levels were correlated with severity and need for hospitalisation of COVID-19 patients. sIL-2Rα amount in plasma of HIV ( human immunodeficiency virus) positive patients has a correlation to HIV viral load and so to disease progression. Similarly in Chagas disease, caused by the protozoan Trypanosoma cruzi, patients have increased levels of sIL-2Rα and autoantibodies. In regard to transplantation, higher levels of sCD25 may be used as a predictor of organ rejection and graft-versus-host disease (GVHD) for hematopoietic transplantations. Concerning CVD (cardiovascular diseases) soluble IL-2Rα has a positive correlation with hypertension, type 2 diabetes mellitus, cardiac sarcoidosis, stroke and heart failure. For neurological disorders, high levels of sIL-2Rα are a sign for increased risk of developing schizophrenia.

=== CD25 as a therapeutic target ===
Since Tregs express IL-2Rα subunit constitutively on the surface, some immunotherapeutic approaches try to use this information for selectivity. NARA1 antibody is used in antitumour approaches to preferentially supplement interleukin-2 to conventional CD8+ T cells . NARA1 binds to the cytokine on the IL-2Rα binding site preventing binding to CD25. This complex should therefore interact with conventional T lymphocytes over T regulatory cells and thus increase cytotoxic activity without increasing suppressing activity in tumour environment. Antibodies directly against CD25 have been altered to contain 'activating' Fc regions for the purpose of antibody-dependent cell-mediated cytotoxicity, in this case Treg depletion. Antibody marks a cell with IL-2Rα subunit on the surface, which is subsequently recognized and cleared by myeloid cell with the Fc receptor. Moreover, for treatment of multiple sclerosis, a drug called daclizumab binds to IL2RA and so blocks high-affinity IL-2 receptors on recently activated T cells for interaction with IL-2 as well as IL-2 cross-presentation by dendritic cells.

From the other side, treatment strategies for autoimmune and inflammatory diseases need selectivity for Tregs and suppression of immune system. IL-2Rα subunit expression on Tregs secures better sensitivity to IL-2. Therefore, administration of low doses of the cytokine preferentially stimulates T regulatory cells over others. Low-dose IL-2 therapy is used for graft-versus-host disease, type 1 diabetes mellitus, hepatitis C virus-induced vasculitis and systemic lupus.

== See also ==
- Interleukin 2
- Interleukin-2 receptor
- Regulatory T cell
- T cell activation
- JAK-STAT signaling pathway
- Cytokine
- Immune dysregulation
- Daclizumab
