= European Federation for Immunogenetics =

The European Federation for Immunogenetics (EFI) is the European association of people with interests in the field of immunogenetics.

== History of the EFI ==
During the early 1980s, members of the Committee created a more formal organisation and the organisation was made official in the mid-1980s. It was initiated to give scientists an opportunity to collaborate with one another, and to ensure that their findings were accurate and of high quality. EFI sets a series of standards for laboratories to adhere to and works to create relationships with other organisations worldwide that carry out similar work.

== Accreditation ==
There are now over 200 laboratories accredited by the EFI. These laboratories are found not only in Europe, but also in Israel, South Africa and Mexico and have met the criteria that have been set out by EFI. The laboratories undergo regular inspections to ensure that they are continuing to follow the standards and that they are producing the high-quality work expected.

== Committees ==
There are various committees within the EFI, including a Standards and Quality Assurance, Accreditation, Education and Scientific. These ensure that the high standards set out by the federation are adhered to.

== President ==
The current president of the EFI is Marco Andreani.

== Information ==
There are other immunogenetic societies worldwide. These include ASEATTA, ASHI, BSHI, and DGI.
