= Sigwart =

Sigwart is a German surname. Notable people with the surname include:

- Christoph von Sigwart, German philosopher and logician
- George Karl Ludwig Sigwart, German chemist and physician
- Jendrik Sigwart (born 1994), German singer known by the mononym Jendrik. He represented Germany in Eurovision Song Contest 2021
- Ulrich Sigwart, cardiologist (for whom is named the Sigwart procedure)
