= Dual therapy stent =

A dual therapy stent is a coronary artery stent that combines the technology of an antibody-coated stent and a drug-eluting stent. Currently, second-generation drug-eluting stents require long-term use of dual-antiplatelet therapy, which increases the risk of major bleeding occurrences in patients. Compared to drug-eluting stents, dual therapy stents have improved vessel regeneration and cell proliferation capabilities. As a result, dual therapy stents were developed to reduce the long-term need for dual-antiplatelet therapy.

The COMBO stent is the first and only dual therapy stent that addresses the challenges of vessel healing in drug-eluting stents. This stent is an anti-CD34 antibody-coated and sirolimus-eluting bioresorbable stent. The COMBO stent combines the Genous stent's endothelial cell capture technology with an antiproliferative, biodegradable sirolimus drug elution. The COMBO stent has received CE Mark approval.

== History and Problems of Coronary Artery Stents ==
The field of interventional cardiology began in the 20th century with the development of the plain old balloon angioplasty. However, this procedure carried risks of promoting platelet aggregation, tearing, arterial recoil, and restenosis. Thus, coronary artery stents were created to prevent restenosis after balloon dilation. There are three types of stents: bare-metal stents (BMS), drug-eluting stents (DES), and bioresorbable vascular scaffolds (BRS).

The first stents created were bare-metal stents where they were made from stainless steel and had poor flexibility. Despite its reduced rates of restenosis compared to plain old balloon angioplasty, it still had high rates of stent thrombosis and required a high dosage of blood thinners. This led to the development of drug-eluting stents to act as local drug delivery and vascular scaffold platform to reduce in-stent restenosis.

Antiproliferative drugs like sirolimus and paclitaxel were used in the first-generation drug-eluting stents to inhibit the migration of vascular smooth muscle cells and restenosis. The first implanted drug-eluting stent occurred in 1999, which revolutionized the course of interventional cardiology. However, despite the drug-eluting stents superiority over the bare-metal stents, drug-eluting stent implantation had possible concerns over platelet aggregation and significant blood clotting in a localized area.

As a result, improvements in the stent material, strut thickness, polymer, and drug choice led to the development of second-generation drug-eluting stents that showcased overall clinical enhancements to its predecessor. The new stent used more biocompatible molecules like zotarolimus and everolimus with quicker drug elution. However, despite these improvements, concerns persisted on the risk of stent thrombosis.

== Risks in Drug-Eluting Stents ==
The development of dual therapy stents resulted from the health risks of long-term use of dual antiplatelet therapy from drug-eluting stents. Drug-eluting stents inhibit the growth of endothelial cells and vascular smooth muscle cells, which are essential for in-stent endothelialization. Due to inhibition of vital vascular system cells, this causes risk of stent thrombosis, and, thus, patients with drug-eluting stents are required to use dual antiplatelet therapy for approximately 12 months. Although long term use of dual antiplatelet therapy research showcases reduced risk of cardiovascular deaths, it has increased occurrences of major bleeding events, which has challenges for patients with bleeding disorders.

== Clinical Applications of Dual Therapy Stents ==
The COMBO dual therapy stent is the first and only dual therapy stent presently developed. The COMBO dual therapy stent combines the anti-CD34 antibody coating of the Genous Stent with antiproliferative sirolimus elution. The sirolimus drug reduces the risk of stent restenosis through inhibiting the formation of neointima while the anti-CD34 antibody coating reverses the inhibition of local endothelial cells from the sirolimus elution.

=== Genous Stent ===
The predecessor of the biotechnology used to create a dual therapy stent was the development of the Genous stent. The Genous stent is a coronary artery stent coated with anti-CD3 monoclonal antibodies that bind with circulating endothelial cells to the stent. The coated stent promotes the formation of an endothelial layer, which protects against thrombosis and reduces restenosis. Furthermore, the Genous stent promotes coronary vascular repair response and reduces neointimal hyperplasia after stent implantation. Although the Genous stent promotes rapid vessel healing, it did not decrease the rate of target lesion failure compared to drug-eluting stents, which increases the risk of restenosis and stent failure.

=== COMBO Dual Therapy Stent ===
The COMBO stent is a pro-healing stent with sirolimus drug elution and anti-CD3 monoclonal antibodies that has enhanced degree of endothelization. The stent has an abluminal, facing vessel wall, bioabsorbable coating that continuously releases sirolimus and a luminal anti-CD34 antibody cell capture coating.

The COMBO stent's enhanced endothelization is due to the sirolimus drug that reduces the risk of stent restenosis and the Genous stent's anti-CD3 antibodies capture biotechnology. The COMBO stent reduces not only the rate of stent restenosis but also the need for dual antiplatelet therapy, which enables high-risk patient groups like patients who are under long-term anticoagulation regimens or patients with bleeding disorders to use this type of stent.

== See also ==
- Coronary Artery Stent
- Drug-Eluting Stent
- Antiplatelet drug
- Endothelial Progenitor Cells
- Coronary Artery Disease
- Interventional Cardiology
