= Freiburg Botanical Garden =

Botanical garden in Germany

Coordinates: 48°00′35″N 7°51′30″E

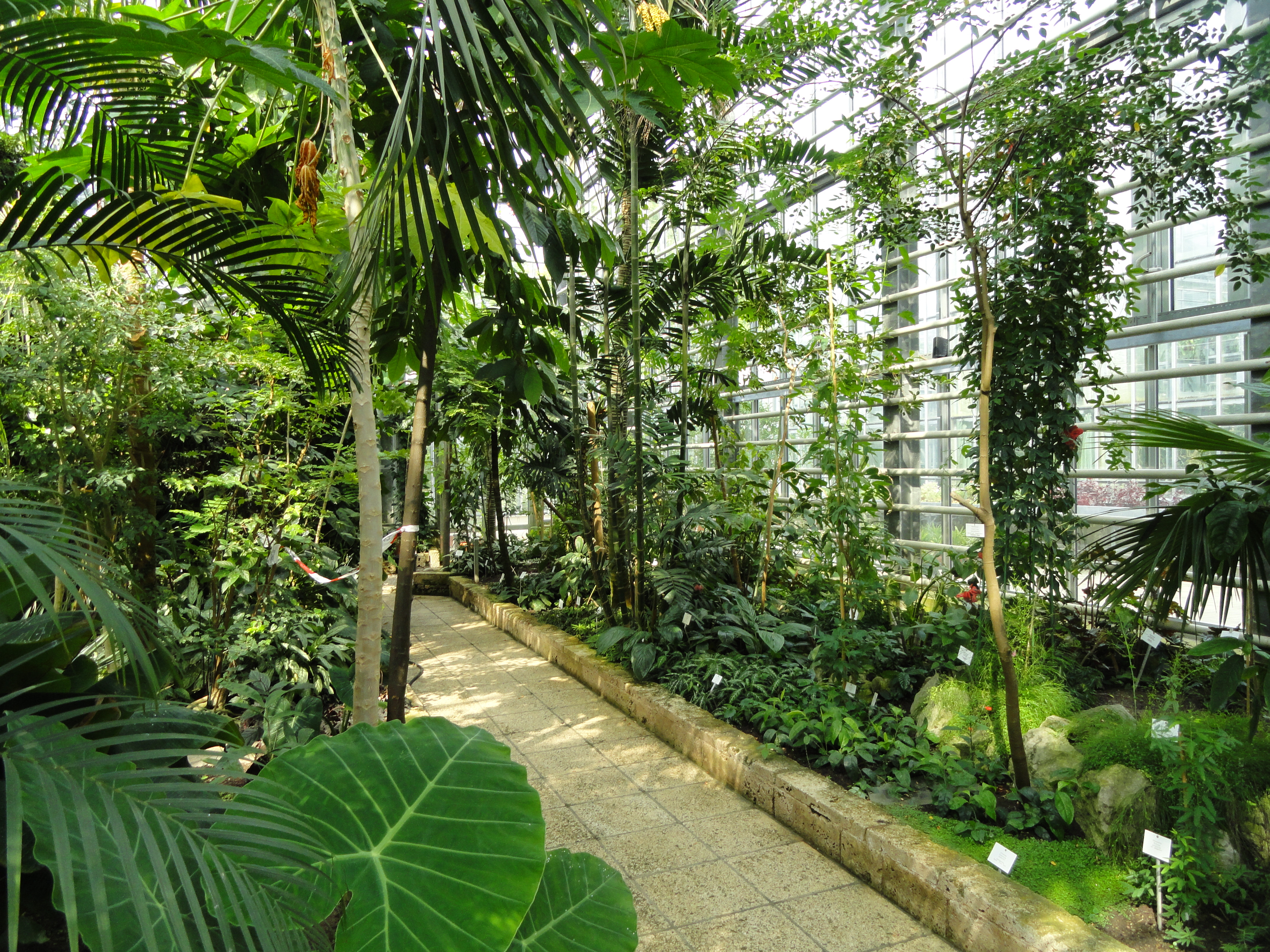
Greenhouse

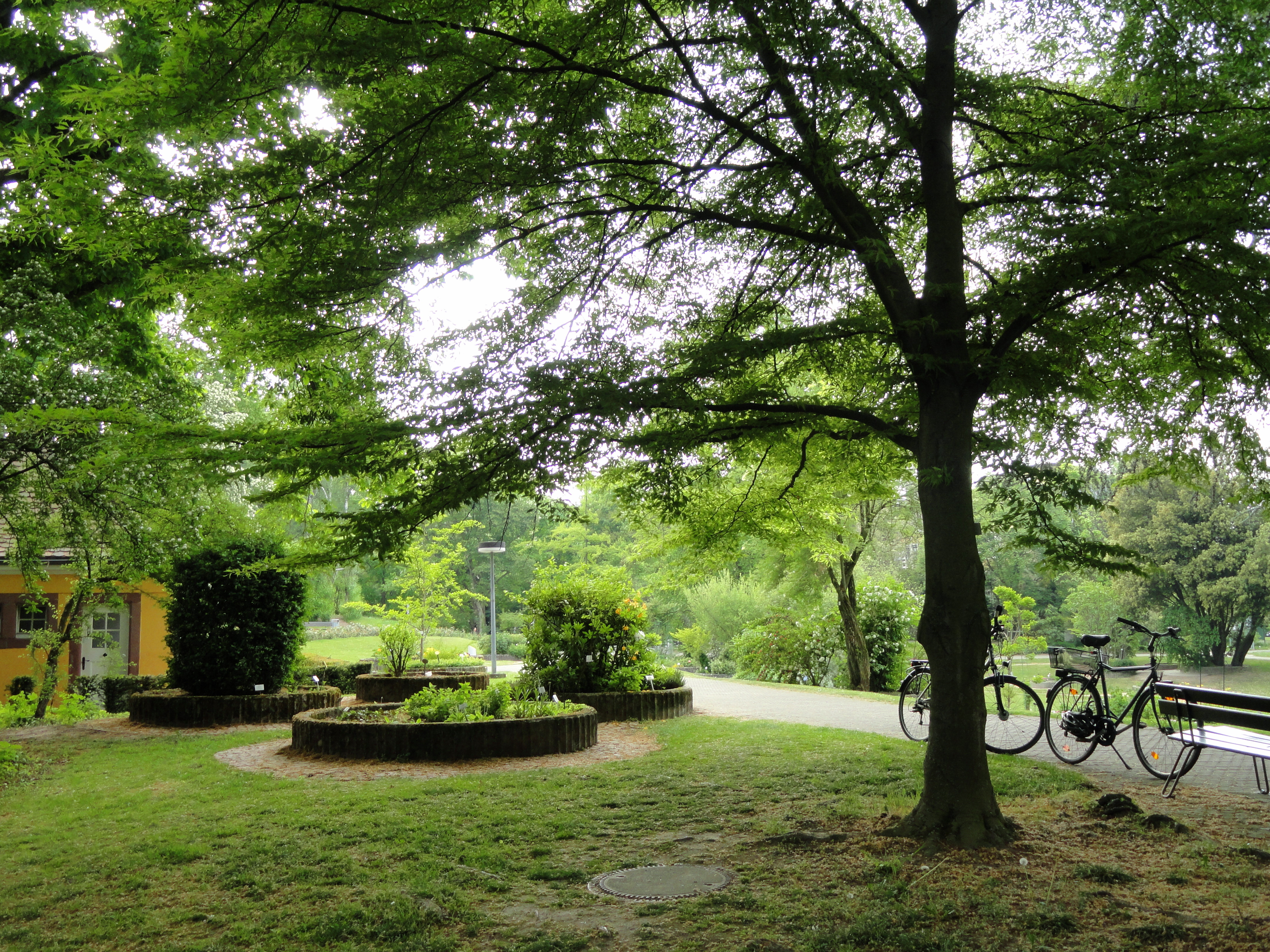
Outdoors

Freiburg Botanical Garden (German: Botanischer Garten Freiburg or Botanischer Garten der Albert-Ludwigs-Universität Freiburg) is a botanical garden in the Herdern district at Schänzlestraße 1, Freiburg im Breisgau, Baden-Württemberg, Germany and is associated with the University of Freiburg as the "Forschungs- und Lehrgarten der Universität Freiburg" (Garden for research and teaching of the University of Freiburg) of the Faculty of Biology. The current director of the garden is Professor Dr. Thomas Speck.

The garden was founded in 1620 by the University of Freiburg. A building on the same property was rebuilt as a hospital for members of the university, which also served for anatomy training. It was one of the first botanical gardens in Germany. The garden was originally part of the University of Freiburg Faculty of Medicine. The first director of the garden was Jacobus Walter (born 1655), a professor of medicine who was also responsible for botany. During the Thirty Years' War, the garden was destroyed.

The garden was rebuilt in 1766, but was forced to relocate to make room for the fortifications built by the Marquis de Vauban to protect the city after Freiburg had been annexed by France in 1677. The botanic garden was laid out near the river Dreisam. Its design was heavily influenced by the onset of the Age of Enlightenment and by the increased interest in botany during the second half of the 18th century. Again part of the Faculty of Medicine, the garden measured approximately 6.6 acres (27,000 m^{2}) in area. Despite damage from floods and the Napoleonic Wars, the garden included an impressive 3,000 plants by 1829, as well as greenhouses built in 1827 and 1828. Directors of the botanical garden from this period included Karl Julius Perleb, Fridolin Karl Leopold Spenner, Alexander Braun, Carl Wilhelm von Nägeli, Heinrich Anton de Bary and Julius von Sachs.

In 1878 the garden at the Dreisam had to be abandoned, and the garden relocated to what is now the Institutsviertel (institutes quarter) and remained at this location until the First World War. In 1912 the garden moved to its current location in Herdern district of Freiburg, when a new institute for botany was built there. The garden sustained damage during World War II in the 1944 air raid on Freiburg.

Today the garden contains some 8,000 species, with research centered upon Black Forest fossil flora of the Carboniferous period, and the functional morphology and biomechanics of living and fossil plants. Its collections include plants from alpine regions, dunes, heaths, marshes, and bogs, with four exhibition greenhouses (900 m^{2}) containing tropical plants, ferns, and cacti and succulents.

== See also ==
- Arboretum Freiburg-Günterstal
- Green Spaces in Freiburg
