= Mia Klein =

Californian winemaker and entrepreneur

- Born: California, United States
- Education: University of California Davis, 1983
- Occupations: Winemaker, entrepreneur, wine consultant
- Awards: Food & Wine Winemaker of the Year, 2003

Mia Klein is a Californian winemaker and entrepreneur, founder of Selene Wines in Napa, California. Her career has spanned decades in the food and wine industry in both Northern and Southern California.

Before studying enology at the University of California, Davis, Klein was a professional chef in San Francisco. Mentored by well-known Napa Valley winemakers, Cathy Corison and Tony Soter, Klein has made wine for several critically acclaimed wineries including Palmaz Vineyards, Chappellet Winery, Araujo Estate Wines, Cimarossa, Spottswoode, Viader, Dalla Valle Vineyard and Robert Pepi Winery.

She is currently producing wine under her own-labeled, Selene, as well as producing wine for Bressler Winery and Boyanci.

== Personal life and education ==
Mia Klein grew up in Hermosa Beach, California. When she was a senior in high school her family relocated to San Francisco. She worked at a wine shop in San Francisco. Klein was a chef working in a seafood restaurant. While at work, she would taste wine, which invoked her interest in wine. She started studying enology at the University of California, Davis, where she worked as a lab assistant for Professor Ann Noble. Klein graduated in 1983.

== Career ==
After graduating from Davis, she worked at Chappellet Winery under winemaker Cathy Corison. In the early 1980s she became assistant winemaker. After Chappellet, she worked at Robert Pepi Winery. She met Tony Soter, while working at Robert Pepi. Soter and Klein would go start a consulting business, providing services to numerous Napa Valley wineries. Klein also worked at Dalla Valle Vineyard. She replaced winemaker Heidi Peterson Barrett at Dalla Valle. Klein was the first winemaker for Bressler Winery in 1999. She is the winemaker for Boyanci and Cimarossa Vineyards (since 2009), and has provided consulting services to Palmaz Vineyards, Spottswoode, Viader and cult wine label Araujo. Soter left the consulting business in 1999 and Klein continues to consult.

=== Selene Wines ===
Klein started her own wine label, Selene Wines, in 1991. The label makes Merlot, Sauvignon blanc, Cabernet Sauvignon, and a red wine blend. The Merlots are macerated in tanks with skins being kept on for 21-days. The wine is aged in 70% new French Oak barrels. The Napa Valley Merlot's grapes are sourced from grapes in St. Helena and near Calistoga. The Sauvignon blanc, Selene Sauvignon blanc, uses Musqué grapes from the Hyde Vineyard in the Carneros AVA. The first vintage was in 1992. The wine is not processed via malolactic fermentation. It's fermented, in 40% to 50% new French oak barrels, and half in stainless steel barrels. The blend is called Chesler. The wines are made at the Laird Family Estate winery. A large portion of the Merlot and Sauvignon blanc wines are distributed to restaurants.
