= Bare-metal stent =

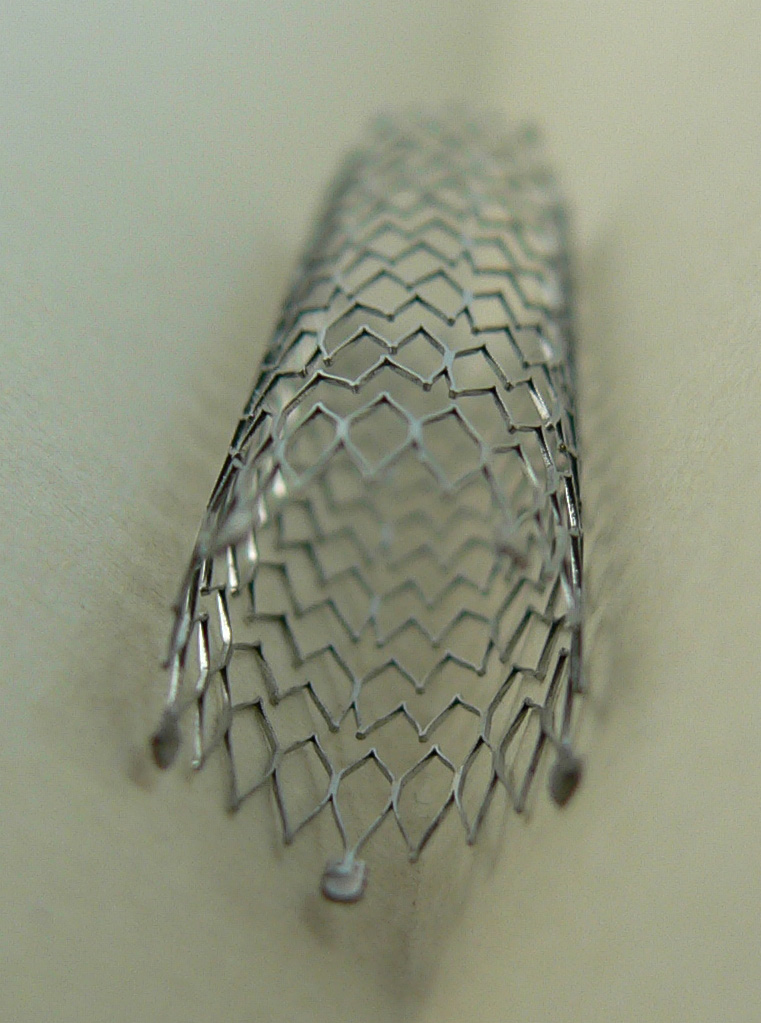
- A bare-metal stent diagonally from the front
- ICD-9-CM: 00.63, 36.06, 39.90

A bare-metal stent is a stent made of thin, uncoated (bare) metal wire that has been formed into a mesh-like tube. In medical care, physicians place stents into narrowed blood vessels to expand the vessels, allowing for improved blood flow and oxygen delivery. While stents have most commonly been deployed in the coronary arteries in the heart, additional applications include the carotid, peripheral, and neural arteries. Overall, doctors can widen narrowed arteries by either placing expandable stents within the artery or surgically replacing the artery with synthetic blood vessels known as grafts. Stents may be favored over bypass surgery due to lower short term morbidity associated with the procedure. Stents are deployed through catheters, which are small, flexible metal tubes doctors thread through blood vessels to reach the target artery.

The first stents licensed for use in cardiac arteries were bare metal – often 316L stainless steel. More recent "second generation" bare-metal stents have been made of cobalt chromium alloy. While plastic stents were first used to treat gastrointestinal conditions of the esophagus, gastroduodenum, biliary ducts, and colon, bare-metal stent advancements led to their use for these conditions starting in the 1990s. Currently, interventional radiologists, interventional cardiologists, and vascular surgeons are the main medical subspecialties that use stents in practice.

Drug-eluting stents are often preferred over bare-metal stents because the latter carry a higher risk of restenosis, the growth of tissue into the stent resulting in vessel narrowing. However, in regions with fewer financial and medical resources, bare metal stents are still frequently deployed.

== History ==
In 1972, the first stent was placed by Dr. Robert A. Ersek at the University of Minnesota. In 1977, Andreas Gruentzig performed the first successful percutaneous transluminal coronary angioplasty (PTCA) on a human at University Hospital, Zurich, Switzerland. In this procedure, Gruentzig threaded a balloon-tipped catheter from the femoral artery into the coronary arteries, and subsequently expanded the balloon in the narrowed atherosclerotic coronary artery lesion. By the mid 1980s, cardiologists had performed more than 300,000 balloon angioplasties annually, a figure similar to the number of coronary artery bypass grafting procedures performed during this period.

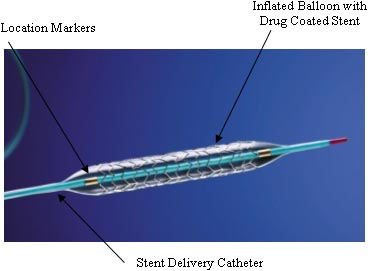
Drug-eluting stent

In 1986, Dr. Ulrich Sigwart and his team at Centre Hospitalier Universitaire Vaudois, Lausanne, Switzerland performed the first successful deployment of coronary stents. This procedure is formally known as percutaneous coronary intervention (PCI). Although PCI did not significantly improve overall survival, it significantly reduced re-intervention rates for the treated arteries. Notably, PCI did carry an increased risk of thrombosis, and the use of blood thinners to prevent this increased bleeding rates as well. Nonetheless, greater than 80% of coronary artery interventions included stents as opposed to ballon angioplasty in the United States and Europe.

== Medical uses ==
Since clinical trials demonstrated the superiority of drug eluting stents versus bare metal stents in the early 2010s, drug-eluting stents have served as the gold standard stent.

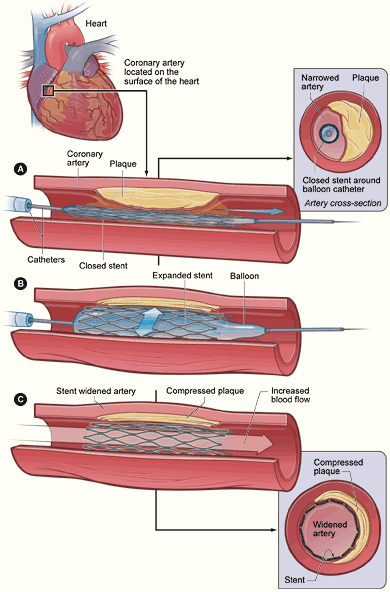
Stent placement in atherosclerotic coronary artery

There are two primary indications for coronary stent placement. These include during acute myocardial infarctions and management of symptomatic angina. For acute myocardial infarctions (heart attacks), clinical guidelines recommend stent placement within 90 minutes for ST elevated events and within 24–48 hours for non-ST elevated events. For patients with angina, indications differ between unstable and stable angina.

Angina is chest pain caused by insufficient blood flow to the heart muscle. Unstable angina is chest pain occurring at rest, while stable angina is chest pain occurring during activity that is relieved with relaxation or nitrogylcerin. In unstable angina, moderate to high risk patients may benefit from PCI as opposed to optimal medical therapy. Optimal medical therapy consists of Aspirin and P2Y12 inhibitors (Dual antiplatelet therapy [DAPT]) as well as blood pressure and lipid lowering medications. In stable angina, optimal medical therapy is recommended first generally. If symptoms worsen or do not improve, PCI may be indicated. Depending on patient risk factors and atherosclerotic disease burden, surgery via coronary artery bypass grafting (CABG) or PCI may be recommended.

After undergoing stenting, patients are recommended to undergo Dual antiplatelet therapy (DAPT) for 6–12 months to reduce risk of re-stenosis.

== Risks and major complications ==
Although PCI has a relatively low complication rate compared to many interventional and surgical procedure, complications can occur. These include abnormal heart rhythms, allergic reactions to dye contrast agents, kidney damage due to dye contrast agents, infection, blood clots, coronary or aortic vessel damage, or catheter insertion site bleeding.

=== Restenosis ===
In restenosis, inflammation stimulates smooth muscle tissue to grow into the blood vessel lumen. This new inner muscular layer is known as the neointima. Neointima layer progression is highly variable, but re-occlusion can occur years after stent placement in severe cases. To reduce re-stenosis rates, biocompatible stent alloys, anti-inflammatory drug-eluting stents, and bioresorbable stents have been developed.

In-stent Thrombosis

With stent placement, both vascular wall inflammation and vessel wall damage can trigger thrombosis. Thrombosis occurs when platelets aggregate within the blood vessel, which can lead to blood vessel narrowing. This may require revascularization to aide in blood flow. Additionally, since the metal stent is foreign, it can induce a vessel wall immune response. This localized inflammation can aid in platelets binding to the vessel walls. During stent placement, vessel wall damage can also cause platelets to aggregate. Since platelet are the primary agents causing thrombosis, patients are recommended to take dual antiplatelet therapy (DAPT) for 1 month after bare metal PCI and 6–12 months after drug-eluting PCI.

== Global utilization ==
Although drug eluting stents have better long-term outcomes than bare metal stents for management of coronary artery disease, bare metal stents remain in use particularly in developing nations. Studies have found that patients in higher income brackets and with relatives in the medical field are up to four times more likely to receive drug-eluting stents. As of 2014, about 10-20% of patients undergoing PCI receive bare metal stents. Bare metal stents may be chosen because drug-eluting stents require prolonged anti-platelet therapy (1 month versus 6-12 month duration) that carries greater bleeding risk.

Since drug-eluting stents may not improve long-term survival and can cost >$1,000 more per patient versus bare metal stents, some studies have advocated that drug-eluting stents are no more cost effective than bare metal stents. Authors have noted that drug-eluting stents are likely more cost effective in older populations with more comorbidities.

== Examples ==
- Stainless steel: R stent (OrbusNeich), Genous Bio-engineered R stent (OrbusNeich), (J&J, Cordis) BxVelocity, (Medtronic) Express2, Matrix Stent (Sahajanand Medical technologies)
- Cobalt-chromium alloy: Vision (Abbott Vascular); MP35N Driver stent (Medtronic)
- Platinum chromium alloy: Omega BMS (Boston Scientific)

== See also ==
- coronary stent – Medical stent implanted into coronary arteries
- percutaneous coronary intervention
- bioresorbable stent – Medical stent that dissolves or is absorbed by the body
- drug-eluting stent – Medical implant to treat narrowed arteries
- angioplasty – Procedure to widen narrow arteries or veins
