= Ulrich Sigwart =

German cardiologist

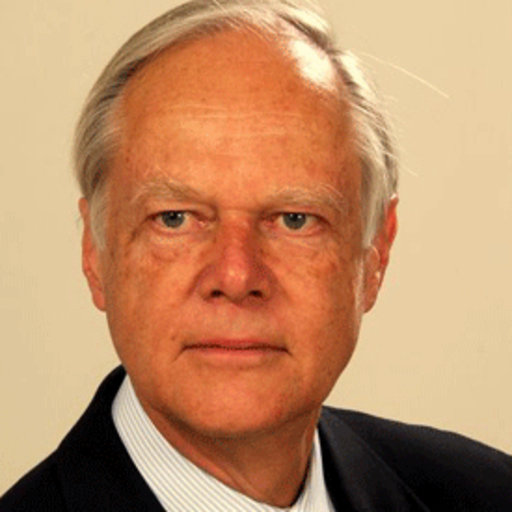
- Born: 9 March 1941 (age 85); Wuppertal, Germany
- Education: University of Münster; University of Freiburg
- Years active: 1971-2006
- Known for: First coronary stent (1984); First alcohol septal ablation for hypertrophic obstructive cardiomyopathy (1994)
- Medical career
- Profession: Physician
- Institutions: University Hospital of Zürich; Düsseldorf University; Lausanne University Hospital; Royal Brompton Hospital
- Sub-specialties: Cardiology
- Research: Interventional cardiology

Ulrich Sigwart (German: [ˈʊlʁɪç ˈziːkvaʁt]; born 9 March 1941) is a German retired cardiologist known for his pioneering role in the conception and clinical use of stents to keep blood vessels open, and introducing a non-surgical intervention, alcohol septal ablation for the treatment of hypertrophic obstructive cardiomyopathy.

Sigwart received his medical degree in 1967 from the University of Münster before gaining his MD that same year from the University of Freiburg.

In 1984, he performed the first coronary stent and 10 years later introduced percutaneous alcohol septal ablation, a non-surgical method for the treatment of hypertrophic obstructive cardiomyopathy, as an alternative to open heart surgery.

== Early life and education ==
Ulrich Sigwart was born on 9 March 1941 in Wuppertal, Germany, the fifth child of August R. Sigwart, a Bayer Industries scientist, and his wife Elizabeth. He was an infant when his father died under suspicious circumstances in Nazi-occupied Europe. His family has its origins in Tübingen where several members played an important role at the local university. Most of his ancestors were doctors, philosophers, or theologians, and a street in Tübingen is named after one of them. He was raised by his mother and older siblings, at first in the Black Forest and later towards the north of Germany.

Sigwart received his medical degree in 1967 from the University of Münster before gaining his MD that same year from the University of Freiburg. His internship was completed in a hospital in Lörrach, Germany, in 1968.

== Early career ==
Sigwart moved to the US and completed a residency at Framingham Union Hospital, Framingham, Massachusetts, between 1968 and 1971. Between 1971 and 1972 he completed a Fellowship in cardiology at Baylor College of Medicine, Houston, and then completed cardiology training at the University Hospital of Zürich in 1973. It was during these years that Andreas Gruentzig was working with catheters designed by Charles Dotter to open blood vessels in the groin.

He was appointed junior consultant at the Gollwitzer-Meier Institute in Bad Oeynhausen in Germany in 1972, and the following year he set up an invasive cardiology program, using coronary and peripheral angiography. In 1978 he published his venia legendi thesis Die automatische Erfassung von Herzkatheterdaten (The Automatic Documentation of Cardiac Catheterisation Data) from Düsseldorf University.

From 1979 to 1989 he headed the section of invasive cardiology at the Lausanne University Hospital in Switzerland. There, in 1986, he performed the first coronary stent implantations.

Grüntzig had already recognized the problem of abrupt closure and restenosis after angioplasty. The need for a suitable form of intraluminal support to reduce or prevent this problem became obvious. Several investigators envisioned such devices during the first years of clinical application of angioplasty. Following the conception and the reassuring animal work with self-expanding mesh stents in Lausanne Sigwart reported the first human implants of such vascular scaffolds. These vascular stents, implanted in the peripheral and coronary circulation, were multi-filament self-expanding, spring-like devices made of surgical steel and produced by a small local company.

In 1987, after several years of preliminary work in animals, he published a landmark paper entitled ‘Intravascular stents to prevent occlusion and restenosis after transluminal angioplasty’, on the use of intravascular stents in humans. The self expanding 'WallStent' was later replaced by balloon expandable-stents that had less risks of restenosis and thrombosis.

Sigwart's early stenting work received great interest and many travelled to Lausanne to observe the technique in practice.. Sigwart's work also provided him with an opportunity to observe the outcomes and indeed the shortcomings resulting from stent therapy.

Sigwart's work revolutionised angioplasty, making it predictable. Stents have significantly improved the outcome of transluminal angioplasty by offering a chance to overcome the problem of abrupt closure and reducing recurrence.

== Later career ==
In 1989, he became director of the Department of Invasive Cardiology at the Royal Brompton Hospital.

In 1994 he introduced alcohol septal ablation, a non-surgical method for the treatment of hypertrophic obstructive cardiomyopathy, as an alternative to open heart surgery.

In 2002 he succeeded Wilhelm Rutishauser as cardiology chairman at the University of Geneva. He retired in 2006.

== Awards ==
His awards include:

- European Society of Cardiology Grüntzig Award 1996,
- Doctor honoris causa of the University of Lausanne 1999,
- Werner Forssmann Prize 2001,
- Sven Effert Prize 2003,
- King Faisal International Prize for Medicine 2004,
- Swiss Society of Cardiology Grüntzig Award 2006,
- Polzer Prize of the European Academy of Sciences and Arts 2007,
- American College of Cardiology Maseri-Florio International Award 2007
- American College of Cardiology Paul Dudley White Award 2012
- American College of Cardiology Distinguished Scientist Award 2013
- European Society of Cardiology Gold Medal 2025

== Selected publications ==
=== Articles ===
- Sigwart, U.; Puel, J.; Mirkovitch, V.; Joffre, F.; Kappenberger, L. (19 March 1987). "Intravascular stents to prevent occlusion and restenosis after transluminal angioplasty". The New England Journal of Medicine. 316 (12): 701–706. doi:10.1056/NEJM198703193161201. ISSN 0028-4793. PMID 2950322.
- Sigwart, U. (22 July 1995). "Non-surgical myocardial reduction for hypertrophic obstructive cardiomyopathy". Lancet. 346 (8969): 211–214. doi:10.1016/s0140-6736(95)91267-3. ISSN 0140-6736. PMID 7616800. S2CID 32959772.
- Sigwart, U.; Grbic, M.; Payot, M.; Goy, J.-J.; Essinger, A.; Fischer, A. (1984). "Ischemic Events During Coronary Artery Balloon Obstruction". Silent Myocardial Ischemia. Springer. pp. 29–36. doi:10.1007/978-3-642-69589-6_6. ISBN 978-3-540-13193-9.
- The SoS Investigators: Coronary artery bypass surgery versus percutaneous coronary intervention with stent implantation in patients with multivessel coronary artery disease (the Stent or Surgery trial): a randomised controlled trial. Lancet 2002;360:965–970

=== Books ===
- U. Sigwart Automation in Cardiac Diagnosis: The Computer-Assisted Acquisition of Cardiac Catheterization Data, Schwabe 1978,
- U. Sigwart and P. H. Heintzen (Editors): Ventricular Wall Motion, Thieme 1984,
- U. Sigwart and G. I. Frank (Editors): Coronary Stents, Springer 1992 (ISBN 9780387545417) (Coronary Stents)
- U. Sigwart: Endoluminal Stenting, W. B. Saunders 1996 (ISBN 9780702020469) (Endoluminal Stenting)
- Ulrich Sigwart, Michel Bertrand, Patrick W. Serruys (Editors): Handbook on Cardiovascular Interventions, Churchill Livingstone, 1996
