= Anti-CD3 monoclonal antibody =

Pharmaceutical compound

An anti-CD3 monoclonal antibody is one that binds to CD3 on the surface of T cells. They are immunosuppresive drugs.

The first to be approved was muromonab-CD3 in 1986, to treat transplant rejection.

Newer monoclonal antibodies with the same mechanism of action include otelixizumab, teplizumab and visilizumab. They are being investigated for the treatment of other conditions like Crohn's disease, ulcerative colitis and type 1 diabetes, and for inducing immune tolerance.

== Mechanism of action ==
See muromonab-CD3.

== See also ==
- List of monoclonal antibodies
