= Julio Palmaz =

Argentine doctor

Julio C. Palmaz
- Born: December 13, 1945 (age 80); La Plata, Argentina
- Education: National University of La Plata, Argentina
- Occupations: Cardiologist, Radiologist
- Known for: Co-inventor of the Palmaz-Schatz Stent.

Julio C. Palmaz (December 13, 1945 in La Plata, Argentina) is a doctor of vascular radiology at University of Texas Health Science Center at San Antonio. He studied at the National University of La Plata in Argentina, earning his medical degree in 1971. He then practiced vascular radiology at the San Martin University Hospital in La Plata before moving to the University of Texas Health and Science Center at San Antonio. He is known for inventing the balloon-expandable stent, for which he received a patent filed in 1985. It was recognized in Intellectual Property International Magazine as one of "Ten Patents that Changed the World" in the last century. In 2006 Julio C. Palmaz was inducted into the National Inventors Hall of Fame for inventing the first widely applied intravascular stent.

His early stent research artifacts are part of the medical collection of the Smithsonian Institution in Washington, DC. He continues to innovate on his initial designs, developing new endovascular devices.

== Education and career ==
Julio Palmaz was born in December 13, 1945, in La Plata, Argentina; Palmaz's parents were of Italian descent, his father worked as a bus driver. Palmaz received his M.D. in 1971 from the National University of La Plata, Argentina. He joined the San Martin University Hospital in La Plata to practice vascular radiology in 1974. He moved with his family to the United States in 1977 and spent three years training in radiology at the University of California at Davis' Martinez Veterans Administration Medical Center. He has worked as Chief of Angiography and Special Procedures in the radiology department at the University of Texas Health and Science Center at San Antonio (UTHSCSA) since 1983. He currently holds the Ashbel Smith Professorship as a tenured Professor at UTHSCSA. In 2019, Palmaz was part of a team awarded the Russ Prize "for innovations in medical devices that enable minimally invasive angioplasty treatment of advanced coronary artery disease."

== Palmaz-Schatz Stent ==
=== Background ===
Coronary artery disease is a condition in which the blood vessels to the heart become clogged. It often leads to heart attacks and is one of the leading causes of death in the United States. Beginning in the mid-1960s, the leading treatment consisted of invasive bypass surgery, in which a healthy blood vessel from another part of the body is grafted onto the coronary artery, forming a detour around the afflicted region. Due to the high cost and risk of this procedure, an alternative was in high demand. In 1977, Andreas Gruentzig performed the first successful percutaneous coronary angioplasty. In this procedure, a catheter attached to a small balloon is inserted into the afflicted artery. The balloon is subsequently expanded, compressing the accumulated plaque to allow increased blood flow. This was a substantial improvement over bypass surgery in terms of invasiveness, but unfortunately restenosis, a recurrence of arterial clogging, occurred in nearly 50% of patients after the balloon was removed.

=== Conception ===
Palmaz got the idea for his stent after listening to a lecture by Gruentzig at a conference in New Orleans in 1978. He had an idea then to put a scaffold of sorts inside the vessels, to hold them open and keep them from occluding. He wrote up his ideas in a manuscript – which became important later as a proof of conception – and started to work on prototypes. He began by sticking pins into a pencil and weaving wire around them, but the structure did not maintain form as it was compressed. He then soldered the wires at their junctions, achieving the desired plasticity; however this required two separate metals, which was undesirable for medical use. His solution was inspired by a metal lathe with a structure of staggered openings that a mason had left in his garage: cutting holes in metal tubing would create a collapsible structure that would remain rigid once expanded.

=== Development ===
Palmaz succeeded in creating a model that he was able to test in animals, including pigs and rabbits, with promising results; he also began shopping the device around to medical companies, but the response was lukewarm.

In 1983, Dr. Stewart Reuter, Chair of Radiology at UTHSCSA and a mentor to Palmaz, encouraged him to accept a position at the center. Palmaz did so, in part because there he would have access to resources he needed to further his stent development. He eventually succeeded in creating a prototype of a stainless steel, insertable mesh stent that could be expanded once inside the body to hold a blood vessel or artery open and allow blood to flow more freely. He also secured funding from a somewhat unlikely partner: Phil Romano, an entrepreneur who founded restaurant chains such as Fuddruckers and The Macaroni Grill, put up $250,000 in exchange for a stake in the product, which Palmaz began co-developing with Dr. Richard Schatz, a cardiologist at Brooke Army Medical Center.

=== Commercial success ===
The trio, calling themselves the Expandable Graft Partnership, patented the stent technology in 1985 and presented it to a variety of large companies. Those firms included Boston Scientific, which did not adopt it; and Johnson & Johnson, which eventually licensed the stent technology for some US$10 million plus royalties. With Johnson & Johnson behind it, and with an additional $100 million invested in its development, the Palmaz stent was approved for use in peripheral arteries in 1991, followed by approval for use in coronary arteries in 1994; Johnson & Johnson quickly captured 90 percent of the market for stents and bought the patent outright from Palmaz, Schatz and Romano in 1998.

=== Litigation ===
Palmaz stent patents were the subject of fierce legal battles brought by Johnson and Johnson against several companies manufacturing stents. After 12 years of litigation, the District Court of Delaware ruled in favor of Johnson and Johnson, declaring that the Palmaz patents had been infringed. The damages awarded for the Palmaz patents were the largest ever in patent litigation history.

=== Medical Impact ===
Within four years of its FDA approval, the balloon-expandable stent was used in over 80% of percutaneous coronary interventions, a virtually unparalleled success. Currently approximately one million stents are implanted annually worldwide. The balloon angioplasty augmented with the use of the stent has become the preferred treatment for atherosclerosis. However, the stent has not completely done away with restenosis after angioplasty, and improved procedures continue to be sought. The drug-eluting stent, which releases chemicals that inhibit restenosis, has shown marked success and seems to be replacing the bare-metal stent in America, though Europeans have resisted the change due to the expense.

== Business Ventures ==
Palmaz formed Advanced Bio Prosthetic Surfaces (ABPS) in 1999, with Christopher Banas, as a private R&D enterprise to develop advanced biomaterials for implantable medical devices. In early 2008, Dr. Palmaz, Steve Solomon, and other principals, along with private investors formed Palmaz Scientific to acquire thin-film and related intellectual property, equipment, employees and related assets from Nitinol Development (NDC), a Johnson & Johnson / Cordis company which has licensed ABPS technology. The company, which operates out of Dallas, will design, manufacture and sell implantable bio prosthetic devices.

Palmaz also created the largest wine cave in Napa Valley, Palmaz Vineyards. It is entirely gravity operated.

== Personal life ==
Palmaz is married to fellow Argentine Amalia Palmaz and has two children, Florencia and Christian. He lives in San Antonio and Napa, and enjoys collecting vintage Porsches. He owns the famous Porsche 917-023, the car that earned Porsche its first victory at Le Mans in 1970. His son Christian Palmaz owns and flies a 2015 Bell 429 Global Ranger N665PV.
