= Arboretum Freiburg-Günterstal =

Arboretum in Baden-Württemberg, Germany

Coordinates: 47.970°N 7.852°E

The Arboretum Freiburg-Günterstal (about 100 hectares) is an arboretum maintained by the University of Freiburg. It is located in Günterstal in the Städtischen Forstamt Freiburg at Günterstalstraße 71, Freiburg, Baden-Württemberg, Germany, and open daily without charge.

The arboretum dates back to 1896, or earlier, when its first Douglas fir (Pseudotsuga menziesii) plantations were created to investigate their uses in local forestry. These early plantings focused primarily on useful trees from North America and Japan. Large-scale plantings occurred between 1901 and 1911 when several hundred thousand foreign trees were planted. After World War II, many rare species were added.

Today the arboretum is jointly managed by the university's Forstbotanischen Institute and the Freiburg Botanic Garden, and cultivates around 1,300 tree and shrub species from 60 countries and 5 continents, including mature specimens of Abies nordmanniana, Cedrus atlantica, Chamaecyparis lawsoniana, Cryptomeria japonica, Larix leptolepis, Picea orientalis, Pinus austriaca, Pinus banksiana, Pinus strobus, Pinus ponderosa, Pseudotsuga menziesii, and Sequoiadendron, as well as deciduous trees including Juglans nigra, Populus x canadensis, Quercus rubra, and Robinia pseudacacia. Two walking paths, each 2 km in length, provide identifying information.

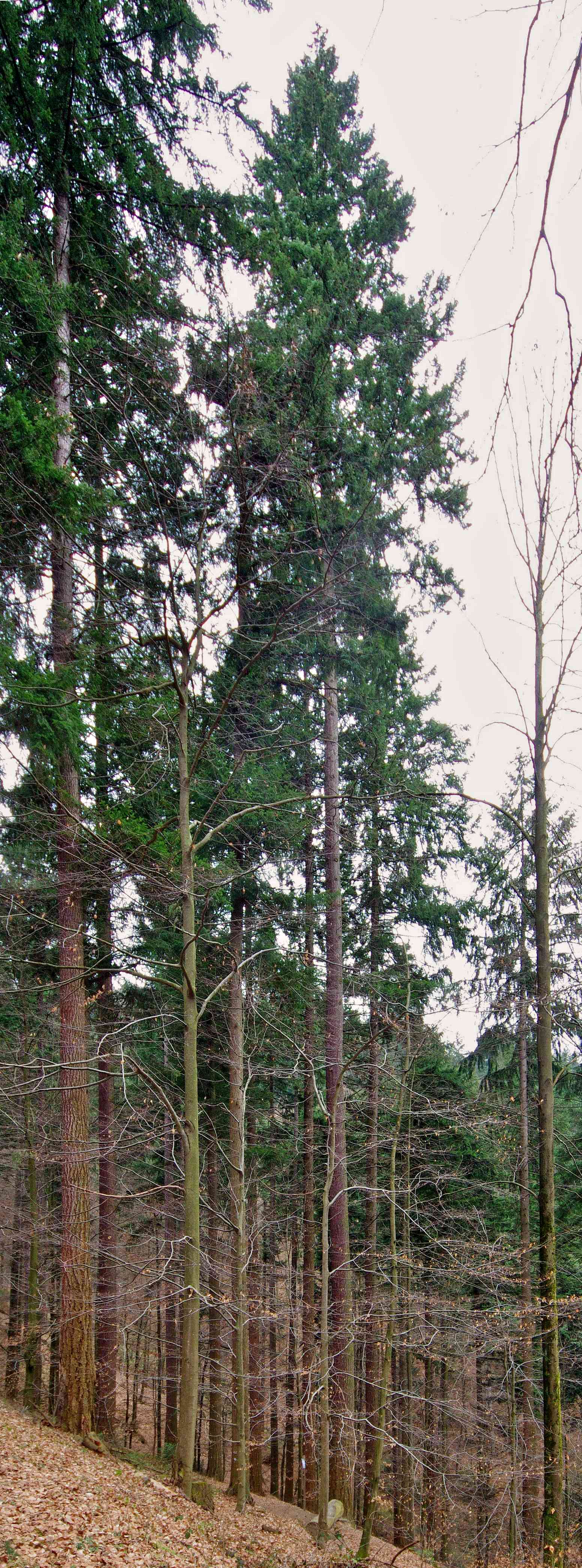
Waldtraut vom Mühlenwald the tallest tree in Germany, Age: 107 years, height 66.58 m, circumference 317 cm at the bottom, measured 2017

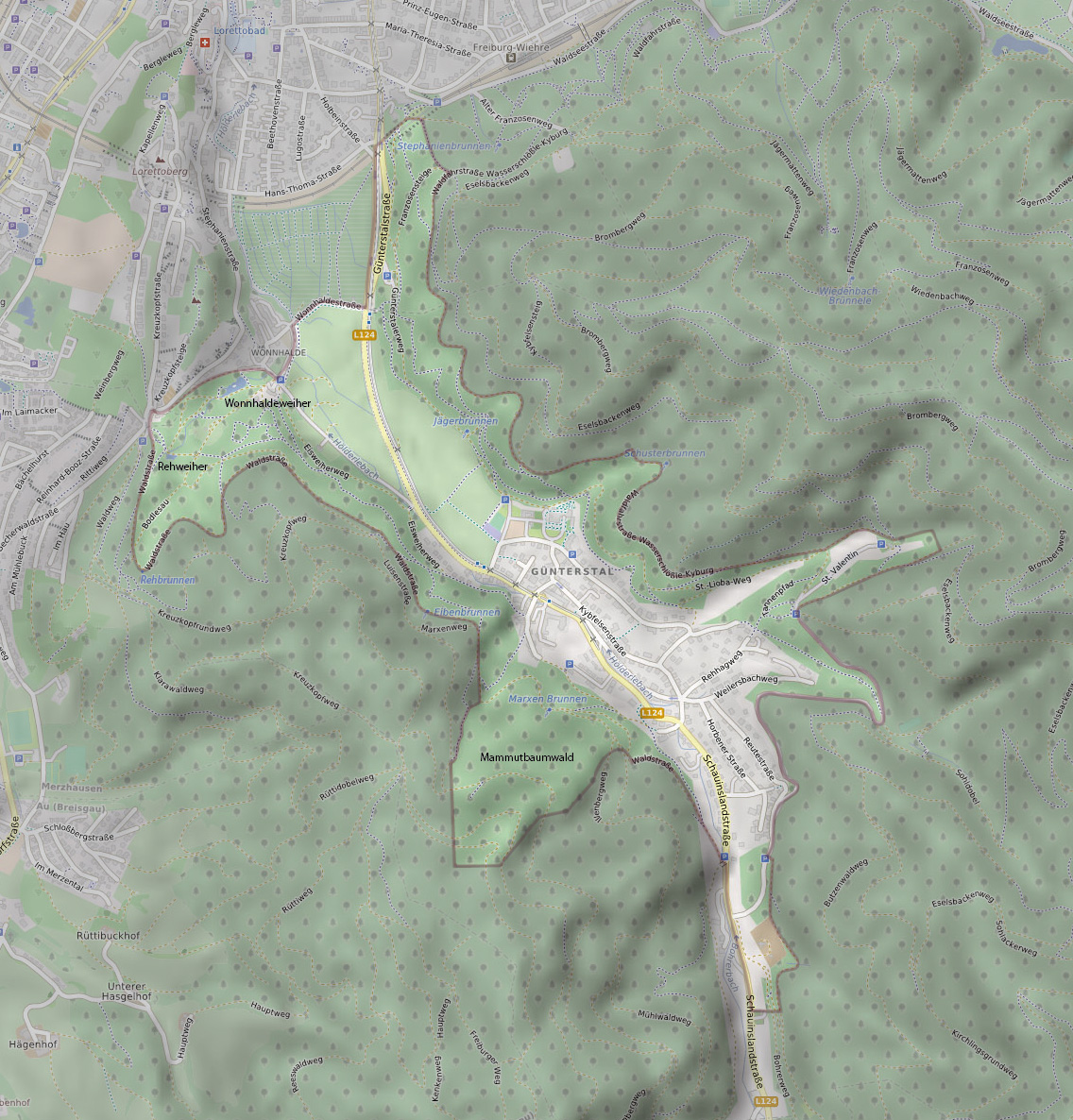
Map of the Arboretum

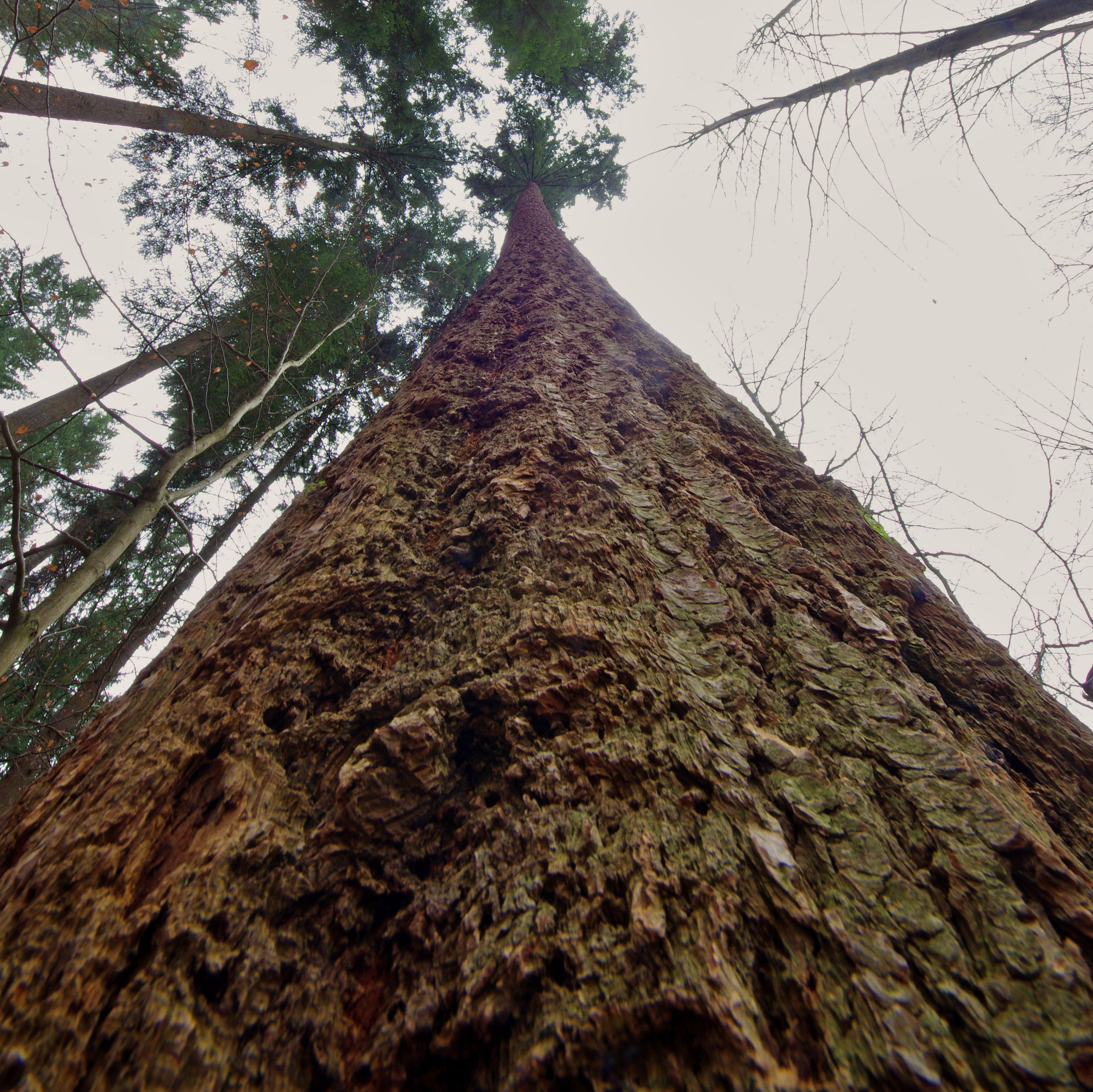
Waldtraut vom Mühlwald

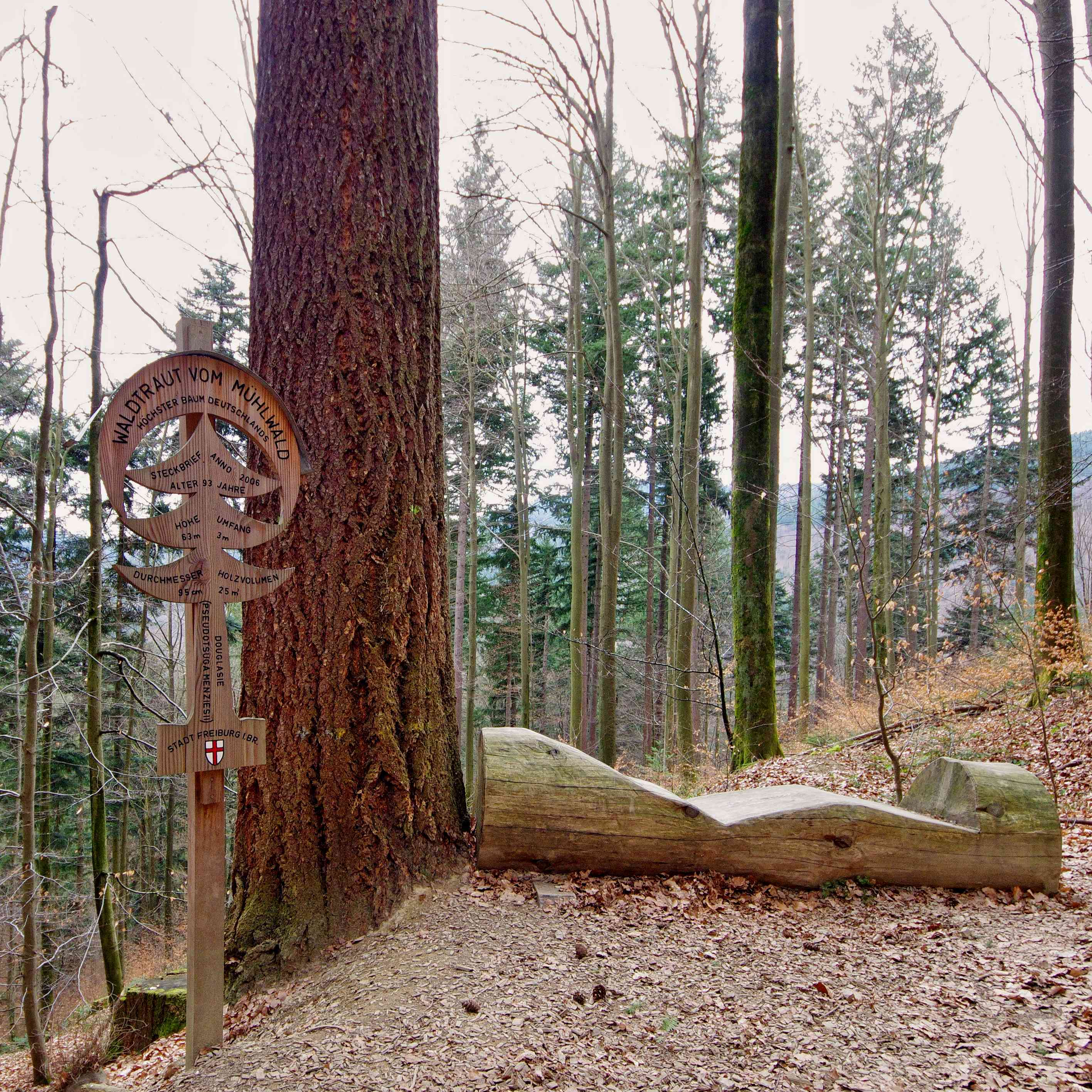
the tallest tree in Germany with sun lounger

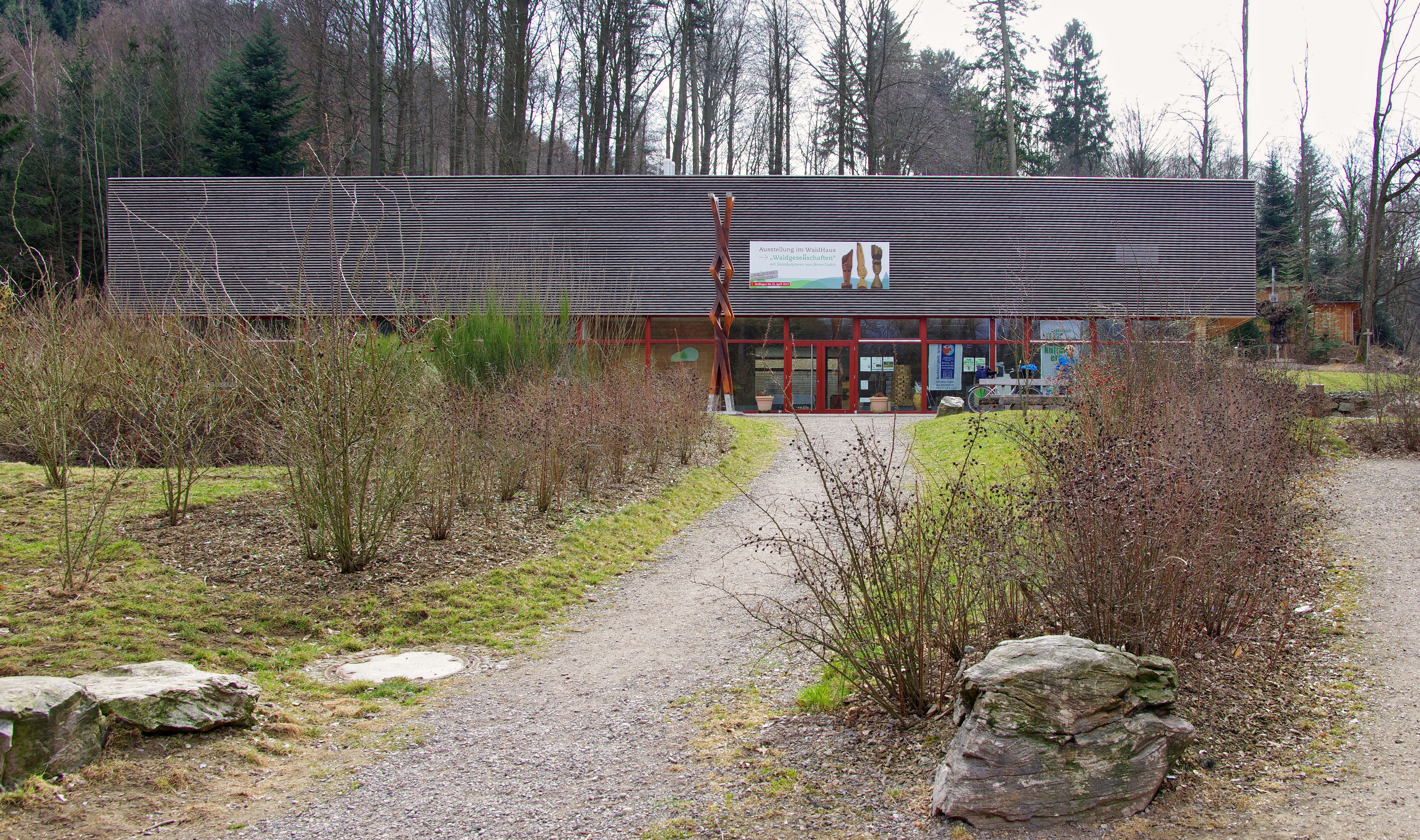
The "Waldhaus" Front

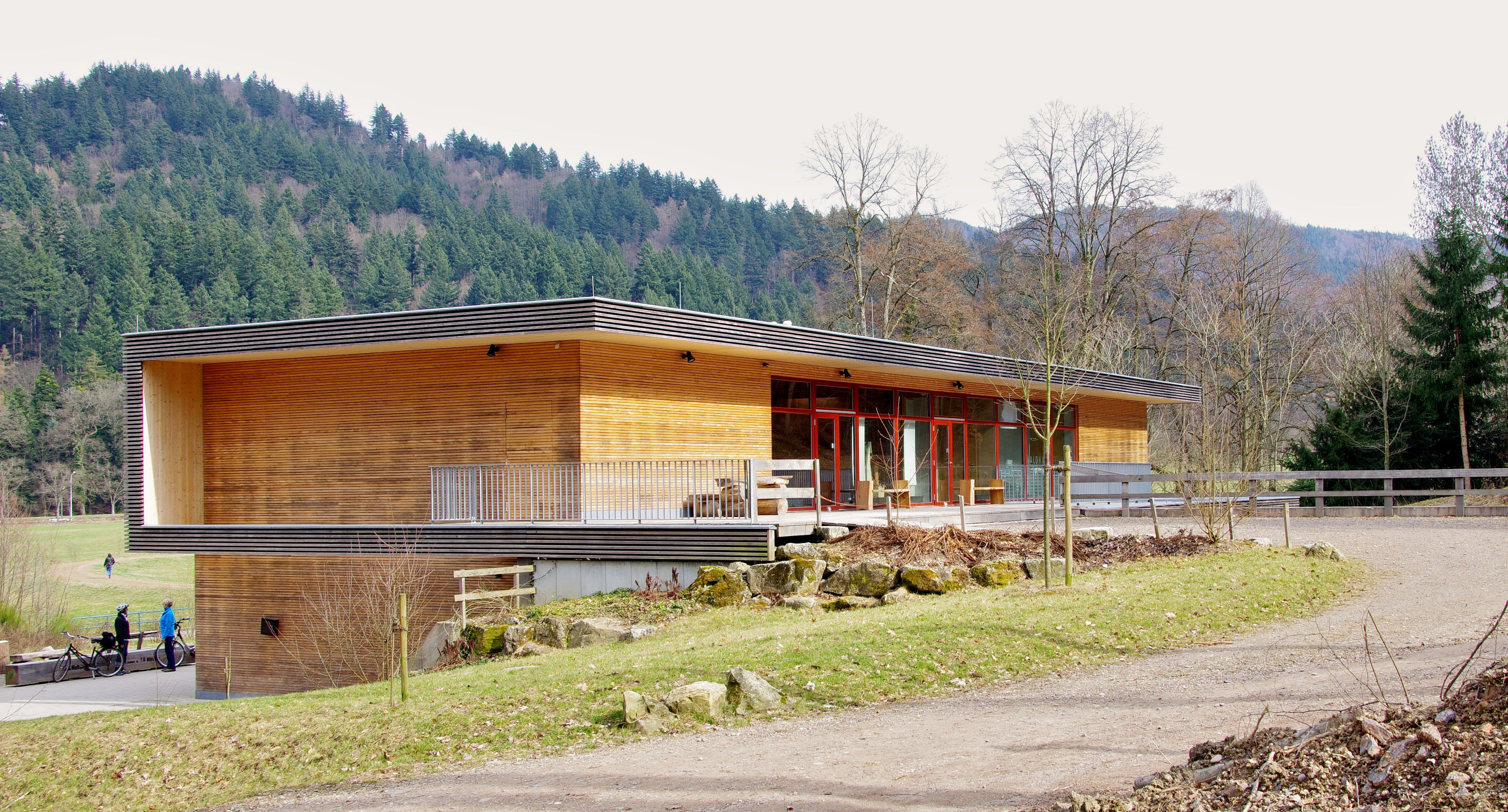
Backside of "Waldhauses"

== See also ==
- List of botanical gardens in Germany

== Bibliography ==
- Arboretum Freiburg-Günterstal
- Brochure with map
- Alemannische-Seiten description
- BGCI entry
