= Genous =

Genous is an endothelial progenitor cell (EPC) capture technology manufactured by OrbusNeich that promotes the accelerated natural healing of the vessel wall after stent implantation. The pro-healing technology has an antibody surface coating that captures circulating CD34+ endothelial progenitor cells to the device, forming a functional endothelial layer over the stent to protect against thrombus and minimize restenosis.

The Genous Stent is a bio-engineered coronary stent coated with immobilized anti-CD34 monoclonal antibodies specific to the Genous technology.

The Combo Dual Therapy Stent is a coronary stent that combines Genous with an antiproliferative, biodegradable sirolimus drug elution. The Combo Stent was shown to be as effective as a paclitaxel-eluting stent in controlling Neointimal Hyperplasia.
