= Charles Stent =

English dentist

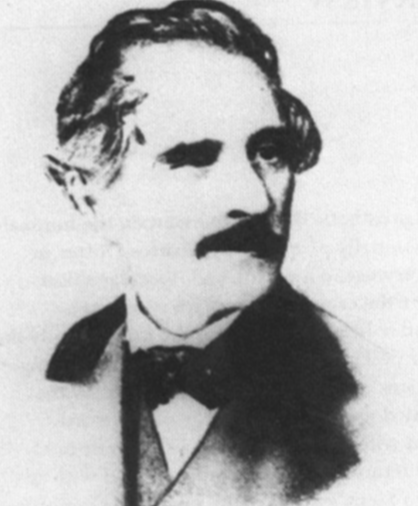
- Charles T. Stent
- Born: 1807; Brighton
- Died: 1885 (aged 77–78)
- Known for: gutta-percha
- Scientific career
- Fields: dentist

Charles Stent (1807–1885) was a 19th-century English dentist notable for his advances in the field of denture making.

In 1847, English dentist Edwin Truman (1819–1905) introduced gutta-percha as a material for making dental impressions; however, this was unsatisfactory for several reasons, including its tendency to distort upon removal from the patient's mouth, and to shrink upon cooling. In 1856, Stent added several other materials to the gutta-percha, notably stearine, which markedly improved the plasticity of the material as well as its stability. He also added talc as an inert filler to give more body to the material, and red colouring.

The medical device called a stent is thought to derive its name from him.

Charles Thomas Stent was born at Royal Crescent, Brighton, on 17 October 1807. He was the 6th son of William and Hannah (née Jenkin) Stent. He had 2 sons, Charles Robert and Howard and a daughter, Fanny. Later in life, Charles Robert added his mother's maiden name of Osborn, to his.

Charles Thomas and his wife Caroline are buried in Brompton Cemetery, west London.
