= Alcohol septal ablation =

Minimally invasive procedure for treating an enlarged heart

- Other names: TASH procedure
- Specialty: Cardiology

Alcohol septal ablation (ASA) is a minimally invasive heart procedure to treat hypertrophic cardiomyopathy (HCM).

It is a percutaneous, minimally invasive procedure performed by an interventional cardiologist to relieve symptoms and improve functional status in eligible patients with severely symptomatic HCM who meet strict clinical, anatomic and physiologic selection criteria. In carefully selected patients, when performed by an experienced interventional cardiologist, the procedure is successful in relieving symptoms in over 90% of patients.

Hypertrophic cardiomyopathy is a condition of the cardiac muscle which grows abnormally thick in the absence of a pathophysiologic cause such as hypertension (high blood pressure) or aortic valve disease. In a large subset of patients with hypertrophic obstructive cardiomyopathy, thickening of the heart muscle in a particular part of the interventricular septum causes obstruction to blood being ejected from the left ventricle.

Alcohol septal ablation is a cardiac catheterization technique designed to reduce the obstruction to blood being ejected from the heart. The technique creates a small controlled myocardial infarction, killing the area of heart muscle responsible for the obstruction, and eventually causing it to fibrose and become less thick.

== History ==
Alcohol septal ablation was first performed in 1994 by Ulrich Sigwart at the Royal Brompton Hospital in the United Kingdom. Since that time, it has gained favor among physicians and patients due to its minimally invasive nature, thereby avoiding general anesthesia, lengthy inpatient recuperation and other complications associated with open-heart surgery (e.g. septal myectomy).

== Technique ==
Alcohol septal ablation is performed in the cardiac catheterization laboratory, and should only be performed by interventional cardiologists with specific training in the procedure. (Current guidelines suggest at least 20 successful procedures to demonstrate competence.) As such, it is only available in a few institutions. The technique is similar to coronary angioplasty, and utilizes similar equipment. Using wires and balloons to localize the septal artery feeding the diseased muscle under both fluoroscopic (X-ray) and echocardiographic (ultrasound) guidance, a small amount of pure alcohol is infused into the artery to produce a small heart attack. Patients typically experience mild chest discomfort during the procedure, which takes approximately 60–90 minutes to complete. Analgesics and mild sedatives are administered as needed. Patients typically are maintained in the hospital for three to four days to monitor for any complications, including the need for a permanent pacemaker in 5–10%. Complications are reduced in high volume centers, defined as a center that has performed more than 50 procedures, or an operator who has performed more than 20.

== Outcomes ==
Relief of obstruction is noted immediately in the majority of appropriately selected patients. Clinical success is defined as a 50% or more reduction in peak gradient across the outflow tract, predicting continued improvement in gradient and cardiac remodeling over the ensuing 1 to 2 years. Over 90% of patients experience a successful procedure, with improvement in outflow tract gradient and mitral regurgitation. Patients typically report progressive reduction in symptoms, including improved shortness of breath, lightheadedness and chest pain. Serial echocardiograms are routinely obtained to follow the cardiac remodeling over time, and document reduction in outflow tract gradient. Although alcohol septal ablation improves symptoms associated with HCM, it does not decrease the risk of sudden cardiac death (SCM) and may possibly increase it due to theoretical risk for arrhythmogenic scarring.

When compared to surgical myectomy, similar outcomes are noted out to approximately 10 years. However, a prospective, randomized trial has not been performed. Despite initial concerns regarding long-term arrhythmic potential after alcohol septal ablation, the risk appears to be no worse than for surgical myectomy. Patients who fail to respond to alcohol septal ablation may still be candidates for surgical myectomy, and vice versa. Which patients are best served by surgical myectomy, alcohol septal ablation, or medical therapy is an important topic and one which is intensely debated in medical scientific circles.
