= George Karl Ludwig Sigwart =

German biochemist, botanist and physician

- Born: October 28, 1784; Tübingen, Holy Roman Empire
- Died: 29 March 1864 (aged 79); Tübingen, Germany
- Scientific career
- Fields: Biochemistry; Microbiology; Physics; Medicine

George Karl Ludwig Sigwart (28 October 1784 – 29 March 1864) was a German biochemist, botanist and medical doctor.

== Early life ==
Sigwart was born in Tübingen in 1784 into a medical family; his grandfather Georg Friedrich Sigwart had been the personal physician of Charles Eugene, Duke of Württemberg. Between 1800 and 1806 he studied medicine, physics, chemistry and botany at the local university and received a doctoral degree in 1808. During the same year, he received a grant allowing him to be transferred to Munich where he worked for the Journal of Chemistry, Physics and Medicine. Soon afterwards he was appointed to the University of Halle and later Berlin, where he worked with Wilhelm von Humboldt and Johann Christian Reil, the director of the medical clinic where he had adequate laboratory conditions at his disposal. During the war of 1812/13 working conditions deteriorated and Sigwart was able to leave Berlin for Breslau and later returned to Tübingen. In 1818 he became a lecturer and professor. He gained prestige in the university, especially in the fields of botany and biochemistry. He married Luise Friederike Burk in 1821. The couple had no children.
