= OrbusNeich =

Hong-Kong based medical devices company

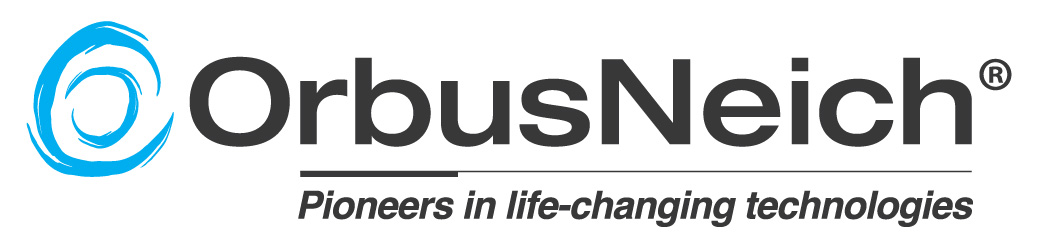
- Type: Public
- Traded as: HKEX: 6929
- Industry: Medical Instruments & Supplies
- Founded: 2000
- Founder: Teddy Chien
- Headquarters: Hong Kong
- Key people: David Chien (Chairman, Executive Director and Co-Chief Executive Officer), Denise Lau (Executive Director and Co-Chief Executive Officer), and Jason Chen (Executive Director and Chief Operating Officer)
- Products: Stent, balloon
- Number of employees: 1500+
- Website: orbusneich.com

OrbusNeich Medical Group Holdings Limited (OrbusNeich) (/ˌɔːrbəsˈniːʃ/ or-bəs-NEESH) is a company that designs, develops, manufactures and markets medical devices for the treatment of vascular diseases.

In 2013, OrbusNeich received CE mark for the world's first and only dual therapy stent, the COMBO Dual Therapy Stent. The COMBO Stent features active endothelial progenitor cell (EPC) capture technology, which promotes the accelerated natural healing of the vessel wall after the implantation of a stent. Several trials including a randomized study dedicated to patients with Acute Coronary Syndrome (ACS) and registries with a sizeable ACS patient subset demonstrated consistently low event rates and short DAPT option of 3 months, if needed.

== History ==
Founder – Mr. Teddy Chien

For over half a century, Mr. Teddy Chien worked with the medical community in various capacities at pharmaceutical and medical device companies. In 1970s to 1990s, he launched Cordis Neich and served as the sole distributor of Cordis Corporation for cardiology products such as balloon catheters and pacemakers in the APAC region. After Cordis Corporation and the assets of Cordis Neich were acquired by Johnson & Johnson in 1996, Mr. Chien founded Neich Medical (the former name of OrbusNeich) in 2000 to focus on the development and manufacturing of endovascular interventional devices.

The Founding of Neich Medical

Neich Medical was founded in 2000 by Mr. Teddy Chien. Neich Medical, with its headquarters in Hong Kong, China, established its manufacturing facilities in Shenzhen, China, to begin the research and development of interventional medical devices, including balloon catheters. It received the first regulatory approval for its balloon catheter from PMDA in September in 2001.

Neich Medical continued its international expansion in 2005 by acquiring its longstanding partner Orbus Medical Technologies Inc., a company with strong ties in the European medical community, whose main business was the research and development of interventional medical devices, pioneering the design of the dual helical coronary stent platform, thus forming OrbusNeich Medical.

Growth of OrbusNeich

In 2016, Mr. David Chien became Chairman and Chief Executive Officer. OrbusNeich commenced selling balloon products in the United States in 2017, and since then, several products have been successfully launched: Jade PTA received FDA 510(k) clearance in February; Sapphire II Pro received FDA 510(k) clearance in March and became the first 1.0mm diameter balloon in the United States; Teleport, its first microcatheter product, obtained CE Mark and FDA 510(k) clearance in March and November, respectively. OrbusNeich commenced worldwide distribution of coronary artery and peripheral orbital atherectomy products for a United States medical device developer and manufacturer.

In 2019, Sapphire 3 obtained approval from PMDA in January. Scoreflex PTA received FDA 510(k) clearance in May. COMBO Plus dual therapy stent obtained approval from PMDA. Sapphire 3 and Sapphire NC 24 received CE Mark in March.

In 2020, the company acquired its Swiss distributor to further strengthen market penetration in Europe. In addition to PCI/PTA balloons and coronary stent products, OrbusNeich is actively expanding into structural heart disease areas. COMBO dual therapy stent obtained NMPA approval in August. In the same year, a joint venture was formed with the European partner, P&F Product & Features GmbH, to focus on the sales and development of structural heart products.

To support the company’s growth, over US$200 million was raised from well-known institutional investors in 2021. In 2022, OrbusNeich was successfully listed on the Main Board of the Hong Kong Stock Exchange, becoming the first and only Hong Kong Main Board-listed medical device company headquartered in the Hong Kong Science Park, raising about HK$480 million through an IPO.

In 2023, OrbusNeich acquired eucatech AG (Germany), PT Revass (Indonesia), and SJ Medicare (South Korea) to enrich its product offerings and further strengthen its sales network. The following year, a high-capacity logistics center was launched in the Netherlands.

In 2025, OrbusNeich also acquired Taiwan Rich Medical to enhance the direct sales network in Taiwan.

In 2026, OrbusNeich expanded European footprint via acquisition of Italian distributor.

== Products ==
As of June 30, 2026, OrbusNeich owns more than 215 granted patents and published patent applications globally. Its diversified portfolio covers coronary, peripheral and structural heart diseases, improving lives in over 70 countries and regions worldwide.

Product portfolio includes Sapphire coronary balloons, Scoreflex specialty balloons, JADE peripheral balloons, and COMBO dual-therapy stents, eucaLimus sirolimus-eluting coronary stents, Support C paclitaxel-coated PTCA balloons, VITUS paclitaxel-coated PTA balloons, Teleport microcatheters, EZGuide and Xtenza guide extension catheters.

Over the years, OrbusNeich has brought to market a range of stent and balloon devices, including a series of angioplasty balloon catheters for the management of the most complex lesions, including chronic total occlusion, for both the treatment of coronary and peripheral vascular disease.

In addition to PCI/PTA balloons and coronary stent products, the company is actively expanding into structural heart disease areas.

== Locations ==
OrbusNeich operates globally, with its corporate headquarters located in Hong Kong, China. OrbusNeich's sales coverage extends to over 70 countries and regions worldwide. The company has a direct sales presence in 16 markets, including Belgium, France, Germany, Hong Kong, Indonesia, Italy, Japan, Luxembourg, Macau, Malaysia, Monaco, the Netherlands, Singapore, Spain, Switzerland, and Taiwan, partnering with over 300 distributors worldwide. The company has R&D centers based in Shenzhen, China, and Tokyo, Japan. Manufacturing facilities are located in Shenzhen, China; Hoevelaken, the Netherlands; and Weil am Rhein, Germany.

== Social responsibility ==
OrbusNeich hosts the Physician Exchange Program (PEP), which brings experienced doctors to other countries to exchange knowledge with local physicians and share skills and expertise through complex cases like CTOs. The Annual Scientific Congress and Exchange for Next Generation Interventionalists (ASCENT) is a tailored educational program designed to provide the next generation of interventionalists with learning opportunities from senior physicians with diverse expertise.

OrbusNeich “Community Wellbeing” program supports local communities by funding academic cardiovascular research, scholarships, sponsorships, and charity events. The program has been donated to various non-governmental organizations to support these initiatives and promote wellbeing.
