= Palmaz Vineyards =

Coordinates: 38°19′25″N 122°13′30″W

- Location: Near Napa, California, USA
- Appellation: Napa Valley AVA
- Founded: 1997
- Key people: Founders Amalia Palmaz and Julio Palmaz; Tina Mitchell (winemaker); Christian Gaston Palmaz (Director of Operations); Florencia Palmaz (Director of Marketing); Jessica Palmaz (Director of Hospitality)
- Varietals: Cabernet Sauvignon, Malbec, Merlot, Petit Verdot, Cabernet Franc, Riesling, Chardonnay, Muscat (grape and wine)
- Website: http://www.palmazvineyards.com/

Palmaz Vineyards is a Californian winery in the Napa Valley, primarily dedicated to Cabernet Sauvignon production. The estate is located on what was once the Cedar Knoll Vineyard Company, a pre prohibition winery, founded in 1881 by Henry Hagen, one of the pioneers of wine production in the Napa Valley. After prohibition the winery fell into a dilapidated state and the winery was abandoned. The Hagen House and the vineyards have since been restored after they were bought by Amalia and Julio Palmaz in 1997. The family-operated winery and vineyards cultivate some 55 acres using sustainable farming practices, devote to Cabernet Sauvignon, Chardonnay, Riesling, Muscat along with smaller plantings of Merlot, Malbec, Cabernet Franc and Petite Verdot.

Palmaz Vineyards is noted for having the largest wine cave in the Napa Valley, totaling 100,000 square feet. Palmaz Vineyards' winemaking and aging takes place within the living rock of Mount George, in a multi-leveled series of tunnels and domes. The height of the wine cave is equivalent to an 18-storey building, providing the vertical range needed for true gravity-flow winemaking. Thus, the wine is not subjected to the violent agitation of pumping, which can change the wine's intra-molecular structure. This gentle treatment allows finer nuances of flavor to develop naturally.

The fermentation dome is an underground reinforced structure. It is 72’ in diameter and 54’ high. Temperature stays constant at 60 degrees and humidity at 75%. The cave houses its own water treatment plant built to comply with strict conservation guidelines.
