= Visilizumab =

Antibody

Monoclonal antibody
- Type: Whole antibody
- Source: Humanized (from mouse)
- Target: CD3 receptor

Clinical data
- ATC code: none

Identifiers
- CAS Number: 219716-33-3
- DrugBank: DB12053
- ChemSpider: none
- UNII: H18SKU3289
- KEGG: D06314
- ChEMBL: ChEMBL2108811

Visilizumab (tentative trade name Nuvion, PDL BioPharma Inc.) is a humanized monoclonal antibody. It is being investigated for use as an immunosuppressive drug in patients with ulcerative colitis and Crohn's disease. Visilizumab binds to the CD3 receptor on certain activated T cells without affecting resting T cells. It is currently under clinical studies for the treatment of ulcerative colitis and Crohn's disease.

PDL BioPharma, Inc. canceled production of visilizumab following its Phase II/III clinical trials, citing its inefficacy and poor safety profile compared to other drugs on the market as the major reasons. Nevertheless, clinical trials continue for various diseases like multiple myeloma and diabetes mellitus type 1 as of July 2009.

Visilizumab has also been radiolabelled with technetium-99m for imaging T cells.
