= Stent =

Type of medical device

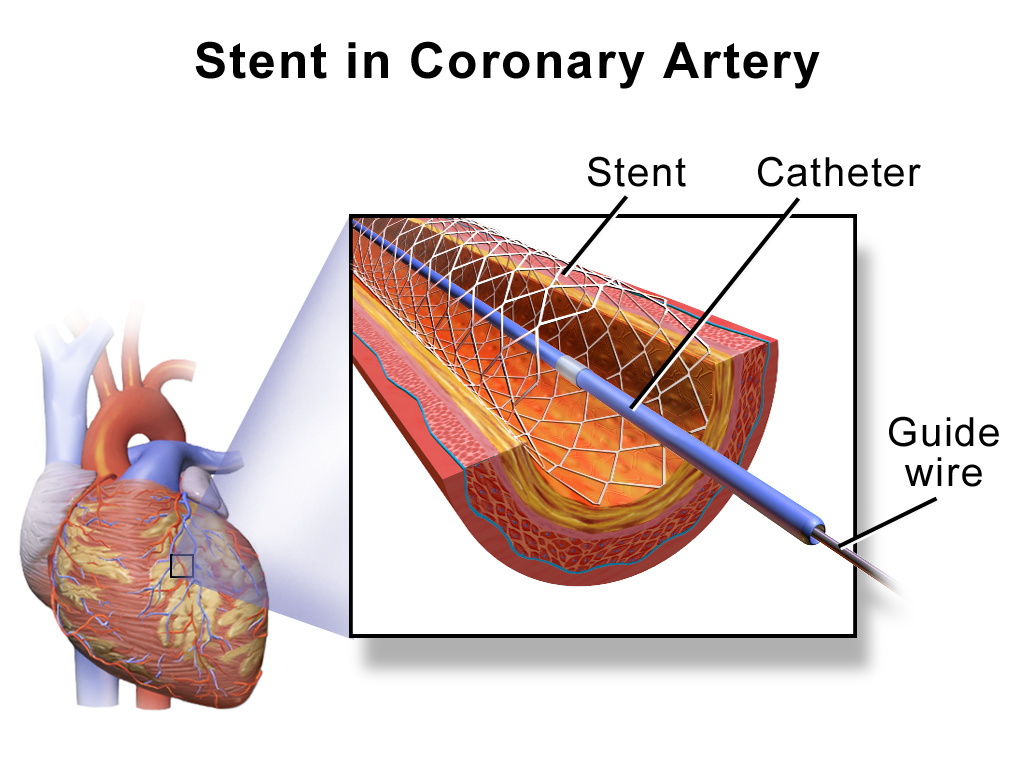
- 3D rendering of a stent in a coronary artery
- MeSH: D015607
- MedlinePlus: 002303

In medicine, a stent is a tube usually constructed of a metallic alloy or a polymer. It is inserted into the lumen (hollow space) of an anatomic vessel or duct to keep the passageway open.

Stenting refers to the placement of a stent. The word "stent" is also used as a verb to describe the placement of such a device, particularly when a disease such as atherosclerosis has pathologically narrowed a structure such as an artery.

A stent is different from a shunt. A shunt is a tube that connects two previously unconnected parts of the body to allow fluid to flow between them. Stents and shunts can be made of similar materials, but perform two different tasks.

There are various types of stents used for different medical purposes. Coronary stents are commonly used in coronary angioplasty, with drug-eluting stents being the most common type. Vascular stents are used for peripheral and cerebrovascular disease, while ureteral stents ensure the patency of a ureter.

Prostatic stents can be temporary or permanent and are used to treat conditions like benign prostatic hyperplasia. Colon and esophageal stents are palliative treatments for advanced colon and esophageal cancer. Pancreatic and biliary stents provide drainage from the gallbladder, pancreas, and bile ducts to the duodenum in conditions such as obstructing gallstones. There are also different types of bare-metal, drug-eluting, and bioresorbable stents available based on their properties.

The term "stent" originates from Charles Stent, an English dentist who made advances in denture-making techniques in the 19th century. The use of coronary stents began in 1986 by Jacques Puel and Ulrich Sigwart to prevent vessel closure during coronary angioplasty.

== Stent types ==
=== By destination organ ===
==== Coronary stent ====
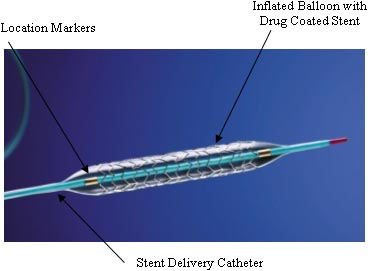
A balloon-expandable coronary stent on a balloon catheter

Coronary stents are placed during a coronary angioplasty. The most common use for coronary stents is in the coronary arteries, into which a bare-metal stent, a drug-eluting stent, a bioabsorbable stent, a dual-therapy stent (combination of both drug and bioengineered stent), or occasionally a covered stent is inserted.

The majority of coronary stents used today are drug-eluting stents, which release medication to prevent complications such as blood clot formation and restenosis (re-narrowing). Stenting is performed through a procedure called percutaneous coronary intervention (PCI), where the cardiologist uses angiography and intravascular ultrasound to assess the blockage in the artery and determine the appropriate size and type of stent. The procedure is typically done in a catheterization clinic, and patients may need to stay overnight for observation. While stenting has been shown to reduce chest pain (angina) and improve survival rates after a heart attack, its effectiveness in stable angina patients has been debated.

Studies have found that most heart attacks occur due to plaque rupture rather than an obstructed artery that would benefit from a stent. Statins, along with PCI/stenting and anticoagulant therapies, are considered part of a broader treatment strategy. Some cardiologists believe that coronary stents are overused, but there is evidence of under-use in certain patient groups like the elderly. Ongoing research continues to explore new types of stents with biocompatible coatings or absorbable materials.

==== Vascular stent ====
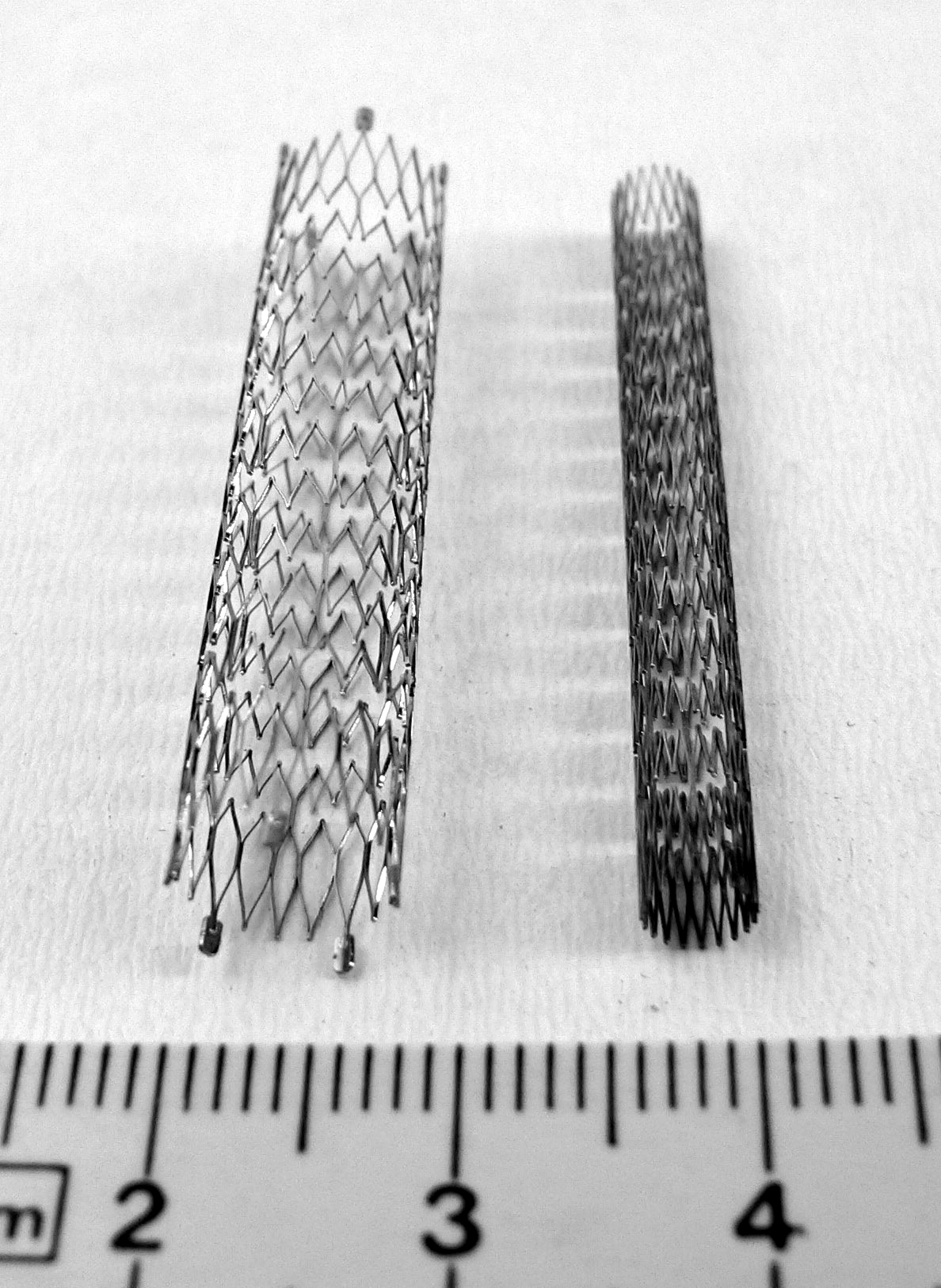
Compressed and expanded peripheral artery stents

Vascular stents are a common treatment for advanced peripheral and cerebrovascular disease. Common sites treated with vascular stents include the carotid, iliac, and femoral arteries. Because of the external compression and mechanical forces subjected to these locations, flexible stent materials such as nitinol are used in many peripheral stents.

Vascular stents made of metals can lead to thrombosis at the site of treatment or to inflammation scarring. Drug-eluting stents with pharmacologic agents or as drug delivery vehicles have been developed as an alternative to decrease the chances of restenosis.

Because vascular stents are designed to expand inside a blocked artery to keep it open, allowing blood to flow freely, the mechanical properties of vascular stents determine how well they work: they need to be highly elastic to allow for the expansion and contraction of the stent within the blood vessel, they also need to have high strength and fatigue resistance to withstand the constant physiological load of the arteries, they should have good biocompatibility to reduce the risk of thrombosis and vascular restenosis, and to minimize the body's rejection of the implant.

Vascular stents are commonly used in angioplasty, a surgical procedure that opens blocked arteries and places a stent to keep the artery open. This is a common treatment for heart attacks and is also used in the prevention and treatment of strokes. Over 2 million people receive a stent each year for coronary artery disease alone. Vascular stents can also be used to prevent the rupture of aneurysms in the brain, aorta, or other blood vessels.

==== Ureteric stent ====
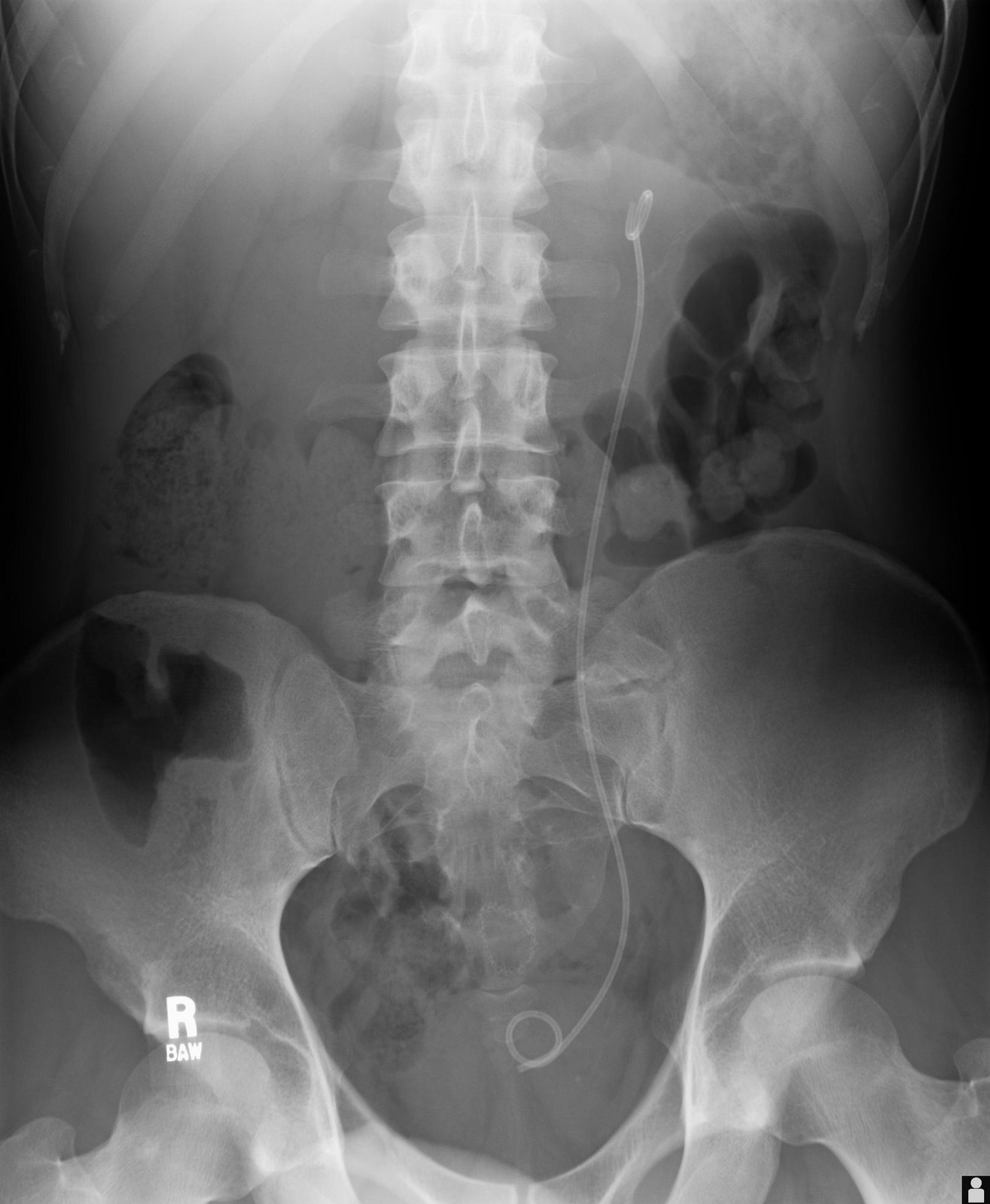
Example of a ureteral stent used to alleviate hydronephrosis of the kidney

Ureteral stents are used to ensure the patency of a ureter, which may be compromised, for example, by a kidney stone. This method is sometimes used as a temporary measure to prevent damage to a kidney caused by a kidney stone until a procedure to remove the stone can be performed.

An ureteral stent it is typically inserted using a cystoscope, and one or both ends of the stent may be coiled to prevent movement. Ureteral stents are used for various purposes, such as temporary measures to prevent damage to a blocked kidney until a stone removal procedure can be performed, providing drainage for compressed ureters caused by tumors, and preventing spasms and collapse of the ureter after trauma during procedures like stone removal. The thread attached to some stents may cause irritation but allows for easy removal by pulling gently.

Stents without threads require cystoscopy for removal. Recent developments have introduced magnetic retrieval systems that eliminate the need for invasive procedures like cystoscopy when removing the stent. The use of magnets enables simple extraction without anesthesia and can be done by primary care physicians or nurses rather than urologists. This method has shown high success rates across different patient groups including adults, children, and kidney transplant patients while reducing costs associated with operating room procedures.

==== Prostatic stent ====
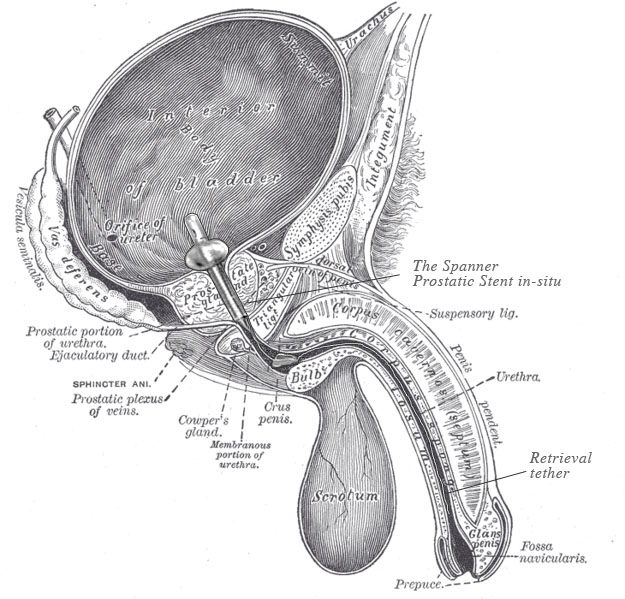
Example of a stent/catheter used in the prostate to treat an enlarged prostate and provide relief in cases of obstructed urination

Prostatic stents are placed from the bladder through the prostatic and penile urethra to allow drainage of the bladder through the penis. This is sometimes required in benign prostatic hyperplasia.

A prostatic stent is used to keep the male urethra open and allow for the passage of urine in cases of prostatic obstruction and lower urinary tract symptoms (LUTS). There are two types of prostatic stents: temporary and permanent. Permanent stents, typically made of metal coils, are inserted into the urethra to apply constant gentle pressure and hold open sections that obstruct urine flow. They can be placed under anesthesia as an outpatient procedure but have disadvantages such as increased urination, limited incontinence, potential displacement or infection, and limitations on subsequent endoscopic surgical options. On the other hand, temporary stents can be easily inserted with topical anesthesia similar to a Foley catheter, and allow patients to retain volitional voiding. However, they may cause discomfort or increased urinary frequency.

In the US, there is one temporary prostatic stent that has received FDA approval called The Spanner. It maintains urine flow while allowing natural voluntary urination. Research on permanent stents often focuses on metal coil designs that expand radially to hold open obstructed areas of the urethra.

These permanent stents are used for conditions like benign prostatic hyperplasia (BPH), recurrent bulbar urethral stricture (RBUS), or detrusor external sphincter dyssynergia (DESD). The Urolume is currently the only FDA-approved permanent prostatic stent.

==== Colon and Esophageal stents ====
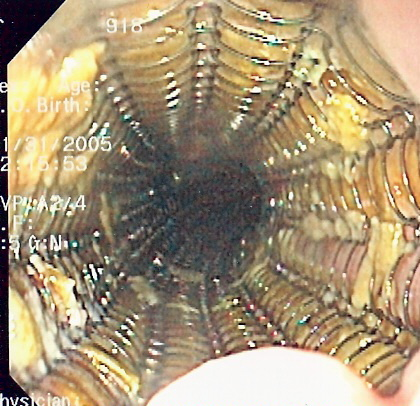
Endoscopic image of a self-expanding metallic stent in an esophagus, used to palliatively treat esophageal cancer

Colon and esophageal stents are a palliative treatment for advanced colon and esophageal cancer.

A colon stent is typically made of flexible metal mesh that can expand and hold open the blocked area, allowing for the passage of stool. Colon stents are used primarily as a palliative treatment for patients with advanced colorectal cancer who are not candidates for surgery. They help relieve symptoms such as abdominal pain, constipation, and bowel obstruction caused by tumors or strictures in the colon.

The placement of a colon stent involves endoscopic techniques similar to esophageal stenting. A thin tube called an endoscope is inserted into the rectum and guided through the colon to locate the blockage. Using fluoroscopy or endoscopic guidance, a guidewire is passed through the narrowed area and then removed after positioning it properly. The stent is then delivered over the guidewire and expanded to keep open the obstructed section of the colon. Complications associated with colon stents include perforation of the intestinal wall, migration or dislodgment of the stent, bleeding, infection at insertion site, or tissue overgrowth around it.

Colon stenting provides several benefits including prompt relief from bowel obstruction symptoms without invasive surgery in many cases. It allows for faster recovery time compared to surgical interventions while providing palliative care for patients with advanced colorectal cancer by improving quality of life and enabling better nutritional intake. However, there are potential risks associated with complications such as migration or obstruction that may require additional procedures or interventions to address these issues effectively.

==== Pancreatic and biliary stents ====
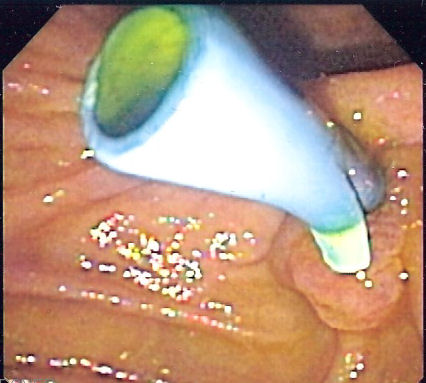
Endoscopic image of a biliary stent seen protruding from the ampulla of Vater at the time of duodenoscopy

Pancreatic and biliary stents provide pancreatic and bile drainage from the gallbladder, pancreas, and bile ducts to the duodenum in conditions such as ascending cholangitis due to obstructing gallstones.

Pancreatic and biliary stents can also be used to treat biliary/pancreatic leaks or to prevent post-ERCP pancreatitis.

In the case of gallstone pancreatitis, a gallstone travels from the gallbladder and blocks the opening to the first part of the small intestine (duodenum). This causes a backup of fluid that can travel up both the bile duct and the pancreatic duct. Gallbladder stones can lead to obstruction of the biliary tree via which gallbladder and pancreas enzymes are secreted into the duodenum, causing emergency events such as acute cholecystitis or acute pancreatitis.

In conditions such as ascending cholangitis due to obstructing gallstones, these stents maintain the flow of bile and pancreatic juices from the gallbladder, pancreas, and bile ducts to the duodenum1. Biliary stents are often used during endoscopic retrograde cholangiopancreatography (ERCP) to treat blockages that narrow your bile or pancreatic ducts. In cases of malignant biliary obstruction, endoscopic stent placement is one of the treatment options to relieve the obstruction. Biliary drainage is considered effective, particularly in bile duct conditions that are diagnosed and treated early.

==== Glaucoma drainage stent ====
Glaucoma drainage stents are recent developments and have been recently approved in some countries. They are used to reduce intraocular pressure by providing a drainage channel.

=== By properties or function ===
==== Bare-metal stent ====
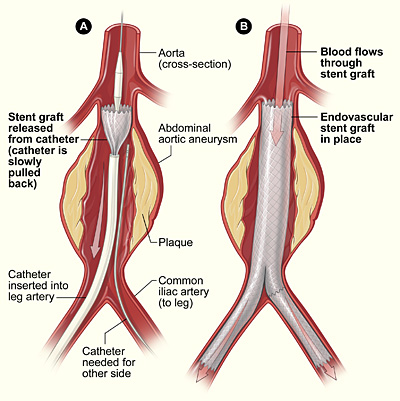
Endovascular aneurysm repair using large stent grafts

A stent graft or covered stent is type of vascular stent with a fabric coating that creates a contained tube but is expandable like a bare metal stent. Covered stents are used in endovascular surgical procedures such as endovascular aneurysm repair. Stent grafts are also used to treat stenoses in vascular grafts and fistulas used for hemodialysis.

==== Bioresorbable stent ====
A bioresorbable stent is a tube-like device made from a material that can release a drug to prevent scar tissue growth. It is used to open and widen clogged heart arteries and then dissolves or is absorbed by the body. Unlike traditional metal stents, bioresorbable stents can restore normal vessel function, avoid long-term complications, and enable natural reconstruction of the arterial wall.

Metal-based bioresorbable scaffolds include iron, magnesium, zinc, and their alloys. Magnesium-based scaffolds have been approved for use in several countries around the world and show promising clinical results in delivering against the drawbacks of permanent metal stents. However, attention has been given to reducing the rate of magnesium corrosion through alloying and coating techniques.

Clinical research shows that resorbable scaffolds offer comparable efficacy and safety profiles to traditional drug-eluting stents (DES). The Magmaris resorbable magnesium scaffold has reported favorable safety outcomes similar to thin-strutted DES in patient populations. The Absorb naturally dissolving stent has also shown low rates of major adverse cardiac events when compared to DES. Imaging studies demonstrate that these naturally dissolving stents begin to dissolve between six months to two years after placement in the artery.

==== Drug-eluting stent ====
Drug-eluting stents (DES) are specialized medical devices used to treat coronary artery disease and peripheral artery disease. They release a drug that inhibits cellular growth into the blocked or narrowed arteries, reducing the risk of blockages. DES are commonly placed using percutaneous coronary intervention (PCI), a minimally invasive procedure performed via catheter. These stents have shown clear advantages over older bare-metal stents, improving patient outcomes and quality of life for cardiac patients. With over 90% of stents used in PCI procedures being drug-eluting as of 2023, DES have become the standard choice for interventional cardiologists.

DES gradually release drugs that prevent restenosis and thrombosis within the treated arteries, addressing common complications associated with previous treatments. While risks such as clot formation and bleeding exist, studies have demonstrated superior efficacy compared to bare-metal stents in reducing major adverse cardiac events like heart attacks and repeat revascularization procedures. Long-term outcomes are still being studied due to their relatively recent introduction; however, DES have changed the treatment of coronary artery disease, improving patient outcomes and quality of life.

== Etymology ==
The currently accepted origin of the word stent is that it derives from the name of an English dentist, Charles Thomas Stent (1807–1885), notable for his advances in the field of denture-making. He was born in Brighton, England, on October 17, 1807, was a dentist in London, and is most famous for improving and modifying the denture base of the gutta-percha, creating the stent's compounding that made it practical as a material for dental impressions.

Others attribute the noun stent to Jan F. Esser, a Dutch plastic surgeon who in 1916 used the word to describe a dental impression compound invented in 1856 by Charles Stent, whom Esser employed to craft a form for facial reconstruction. The full account is described in the Journal of the History of Dentistry. According to the author, from the use of Stent's compound as a support for facial tissues evolved the use of a stent to hold open various body structures.

The verb form "stenting" was used for centuries to describe the process of stiffening garments (a usage long obsolete, per the Oxford English Dictionary), and some believe this to be the origin. According to the Merriam Webster Third New International Dictionary, the noun evolved from the Middle English verb stenten, shortened from extenten 'to stretch', which in turn came from Latin extentus, the past participle of extendō 'to stretch out'.

The first (self-expanding) "stents" used in medical practice in 1986 by Ulrich Sigwart in Lausanne were initially called "Wallstents" after their inventor, Hans Wallstén. Julio Palmaz et al. created a balloon-expandable stent that is currently used.

== History ==
The first use of a coronary stent is typically attributed to Jacques Puel and Ulrich Sigwart, who implanted a stent into a patient in Toulouse, France, in 1986. That stent was used as a scaffold to prevent a vessel from closing and to avoid restenosis in coronary surgery—a condition where scar tissue grows within the stent and interferes with vascular flow. Shortly thereafter, in 1987, radiologist Julio Palmaz (known for patenting a balloon-expandable stent) and cardiologist Richard Schatz implanted their similar stent into a patient in Germany.

Though several doctors have been credited with the creation of the stent, the first FDA-approved stent in the U.S. (1993) was created by radiologist Cesare Gianturco and cardiologist Gary Roubin, who had worked closely with Andreas Gruentzig. Known as the Flex-Stent, FDA approval followed a year later for the Palmaz-Schatz.

To further reduce the incidence of restenosis, the drug-eluting stent was introduced in 2003. Research has led to general stent design changes and improvements since that time. Bioresorbable scaffolds have also entered the market, though a large-scale clinical trial showed higher acute risks compared to drug-eluding stents. As a result, the FDA issued an official warning for their use in 2013, and research on the design and performance optimisation of stents is ongoing.

== See also ==
- bronchoscopy – procedure allowing a physician to look at a patient's airways
- colonoscopy – examination of the bowel
- esophagogastroduodenoscopy – diagnostic endoscopic procedure
- grommet – ring or edge strip inserted into a hole through thin material
- interventional radiology – medical subspecialty
