= University of Freiburg Faculty of Medicine =

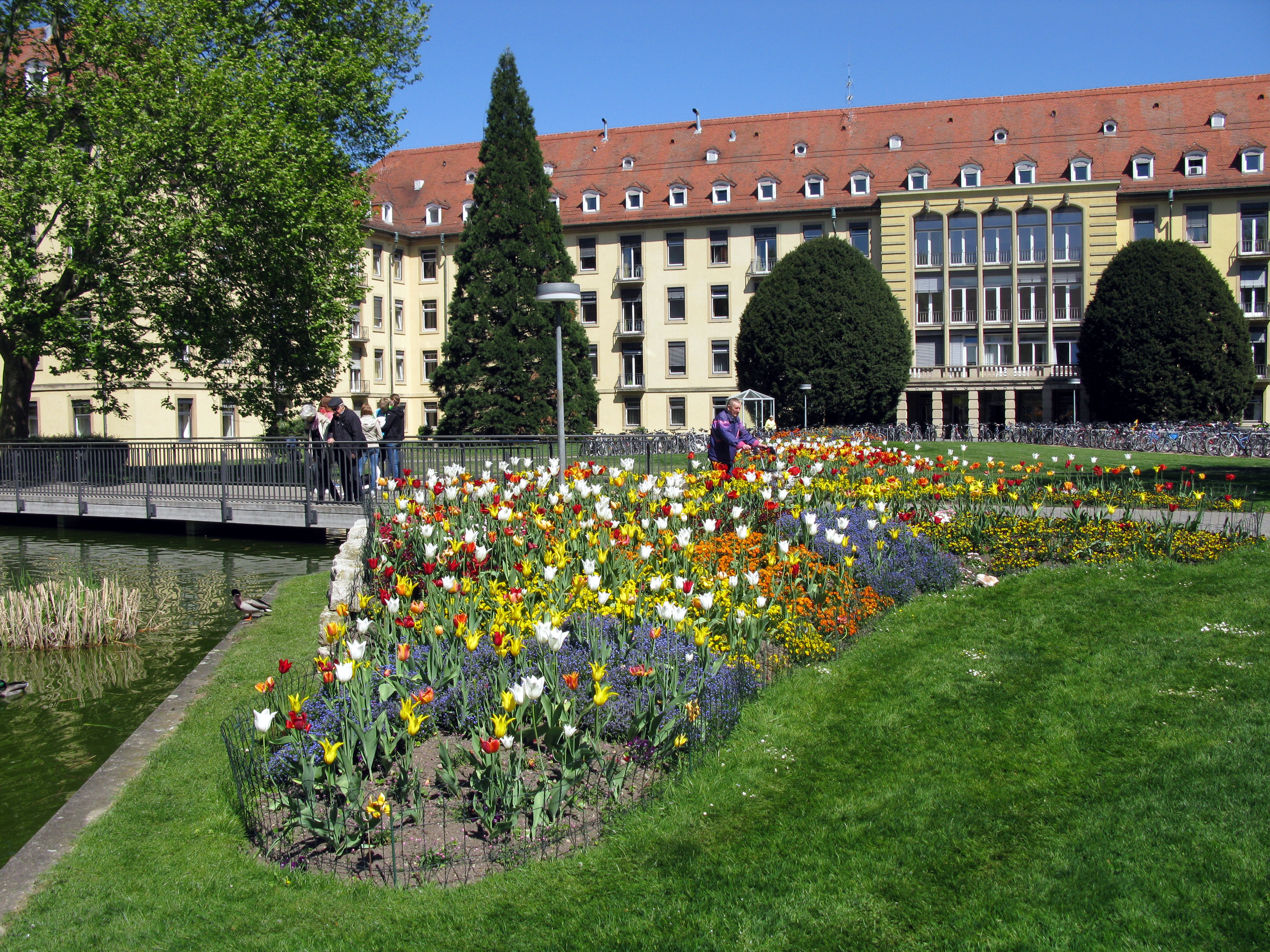
- Type: Public
- Established: 1457
- Dean: Kerstin Krieglstein, PhD
- Faculty: 2,900+
- Students: 2,606 Medicine; 174 Molecular Medicine; 535 Dental Medicine
- Location: Freiburg, Baden-Württemberg, Germany
- Research Funding: €71,000,000 annually
- Website: www.med.uni-freiburg.de
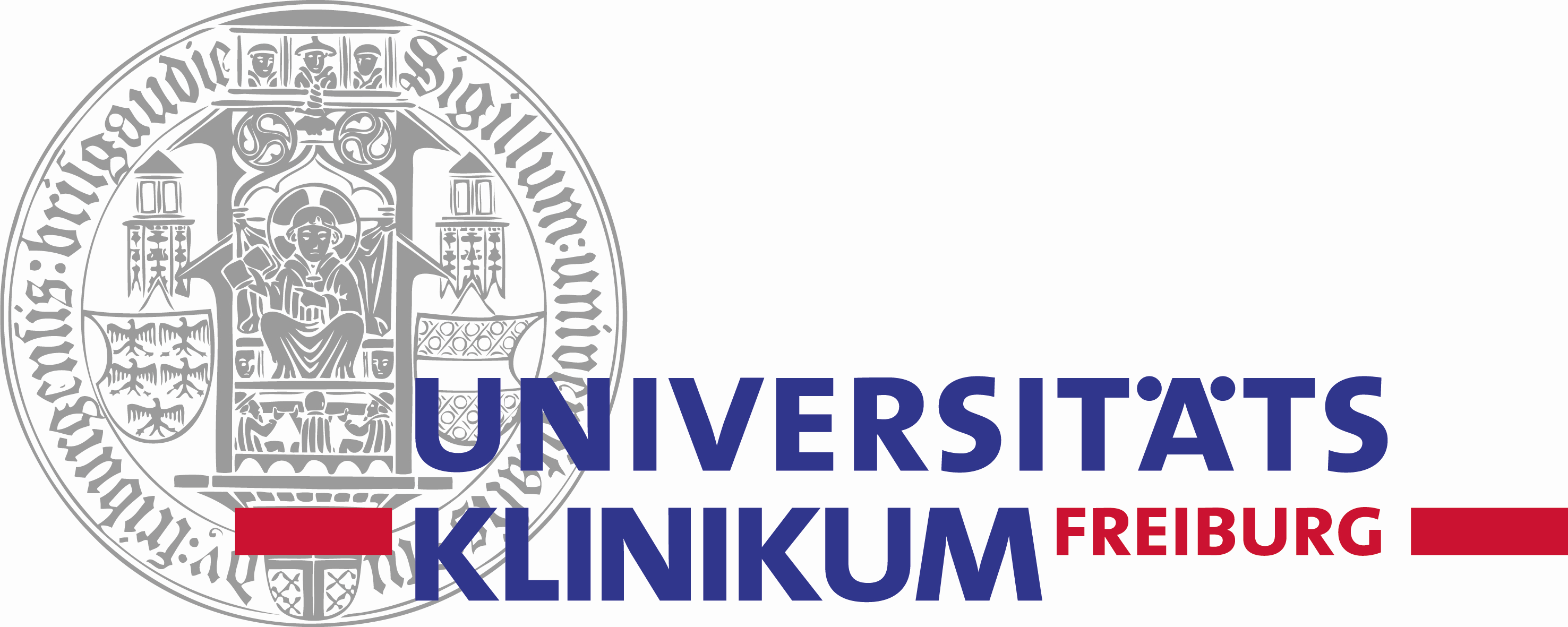

The University of Freiburg Faculty of Medicine (German Medizinische Fakultät der Albert-Ludwigs-Universität Freiburg) is the medical school and dental school of the University of Freiburg and forms university's biomedical research unit together the University Medical Center Freiburg. The faculty was founded in 1457 as one of Germany's oldest and is regarded among its most distinguished. Institutes and buildings are located at the Medical Center campus in Freiburg's Stühlinger district and in the Institute Quarter in the Neuburg district. The Faculty of Medicine consistently ranks very highly in a variety of national and international rankings, such as those published by the German periodicals Der Spiegel and Focus. The University of Freiburg is ranked 4th in Germany in funding for life sciences research by the German Research Foundation overall and ranked 2nd in funding per professor.

== History ==
The Faculty of Medicine was one of the original four faculties constituting the University of Freiburg when it was founded in 1457. At first, the faculty consisted of only a single professor and few students. Medical education in the early modern era was mainly marked by theory and the reading of texts from classical and Arabic works that had been translated to Latin. As was common at the time, little emphasis was placed on patient care and bedside teaching in the curriculum and academic medicine shared the health care market with other professions such as barber surgeons, midwives, and lithotomists. During the period of enlightened absolutism, a new interest by the state in philanthropy saw the founding of several secular hospitals, a development which also revolutionized the medical curricula. Clinical classes were introduced and the university's first own clinic was founded in 1751.

The 19th century marked the dawn of modern scientific medicine, a development that was also very present in Freiburg. At the time, German universities were leading in the sciences, attracting talent from across the globe. This held true for Freiburg as well, as the university and, in particular, its medical faculty, were home to famous scientists and physicians. At the start of the 20th century, the Faculty of Medicine possessed a number of clinics spread out over Freiburg. Plans to merge these clinics into a main building complex were delayed by the onset of World War I. After the war, the clinics were merged at one location to form the University Medical Center, a set of buildings that still form the main campus today. During the Weimar Republic, Freiburg was able to maintain its reputation despite the turbulent times, mending ties with the international academic community. During the Third Reich, the university and its faculties participated in the expulsion of Jewish faculty members and students and most department chairs offered their services to the regime. The pathologist Franz Büchner formed a notable exception when publicly speaking out against the Nazi euthanasia program, the only known protest of a prominent physician against the program.

During World War II, the University Medical Center was badly damaged in a British bombing raid in 1944. After the end of the war, the Medical Center was rebuilt and expanded. The second half of the 20th century saw the re-establishment of Freiburg as a leading center for university medicine in Europe as investments in research and the development of novel therapies fueled the Medical Center's growth.

== Education ==
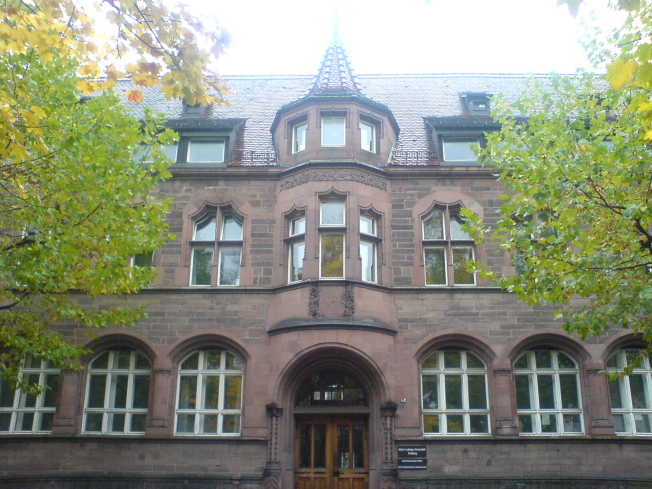
The Institute for Medical Ethics and History of Medicine and the Institute for Biostatistics and Medical Informatics at the Faculty of Medicine.

The Faculty of Medicine offers four core degree programs:

- medicine
- dental medicine
- molecular medicine
- nursing (B.Sc.)

Currently, approximately 3,000 students are enrolled at the Faculty of Medicine, while the medical program is by far the largest with about 2,500 students. Each year, around 340 students are admitted to the medical program and circa 40 each to the dental and molecular medicine programs. Admission to all three programs is highly competitive. An MD/PhD program is also available in cooperation with the Spemann Graduate School of Biology and Medicine. Additionally, as of 2008 the International Master Program in Biomedical Sciences (IMBS) is being offered as a joint program between the University of Freiburg and the University of Buenos Aires. Further recent developments have led to the creation of the Master Online in Periodontics, the Master Online in Palliative Care, and the Master Online in Physical-Technical Medicine, aimed at professionals and consisting of online and on-campus segments.

The Faculty of Medicine employs 1334 physicians and researchers full-time and 116 professors.

According to a recent survey supported by the German Federal Ministry for Education and Research, the University of Freiburg Faculty of Medicine topped the list of the most attractive medical schools for students, receiving the most applications for an MD program in Germany. Only about 5% of the applicants were admitted, also making Freiburg one of the most selective schools.

Freiburg medical students regularly score very well on the two federal medical exams Erster Abschnitt der ärztlichen Prüfung and Zweiter Abschnitt der ärztlichen Prüfung.

According to the 2005 Humboldt Ranking, measuring the number of research stays by foreign fellows and award winners sponsored by the Humboldt Foundation, Freiburg placed second in the life sciences.

For more information about German medical education, see also: Medical School in Germany

== Research ==
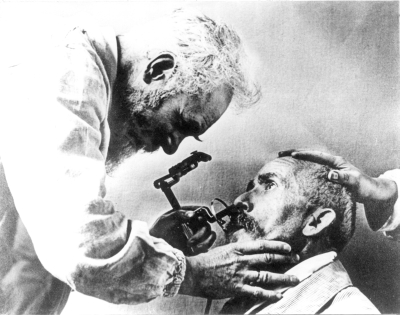
Gustav Killian preparing a bronchoscopy in circa 1900.

The Faculty of Medicine is engaged in research in a wide variety of fields spanning the breadth of medical science. It has also selected key research areas on which to place additional emphasis. As of 2009, these areas include: molecular cell research and stem cell research, infectious diseases and immunology, oncology and functional genetics, vascular and developmental biology, neurosciences, and molecular and functional imaging.

Among those involved are the Bioss Centre for Biological Signalling Studies, the Spemann Graduate School of Biology and Medicine, and the Freiburg Institute for Advanced Studies (FRIAS), which were created in conjunction with the success of the University of Freiburg Excellence Initiative of German universities. Furthermore, various research clusters funded by the German Research Foundation, the Bernstein Center for Computational Neuroscience, the Ludwig Heilmeyer Comprehensive Cancer Center Freiburg, the Center for Chronic Immunodeficiency, and the Center for Biological Systems Analysis provide for extensive research capabilities, propelling the University of Freiburg into a leading position. As mentioned above, the Faculty of Medicine ranks highly in a series of rankings also measuring research output. In the 2010 edition of the Academic Ranking of World Universities compiled by Shanghai Jiaotong University the University of Freiburg ranked in the group 76–100 in the subject field Clinical Medicine and Pharmacy and the group 51-75 for Life and Agriculture Sciences. QS World University Rankings ranked Freiburg 87th worldwide in Life Sciences & Biomedicine in their 2009 edition.

== Campus ==
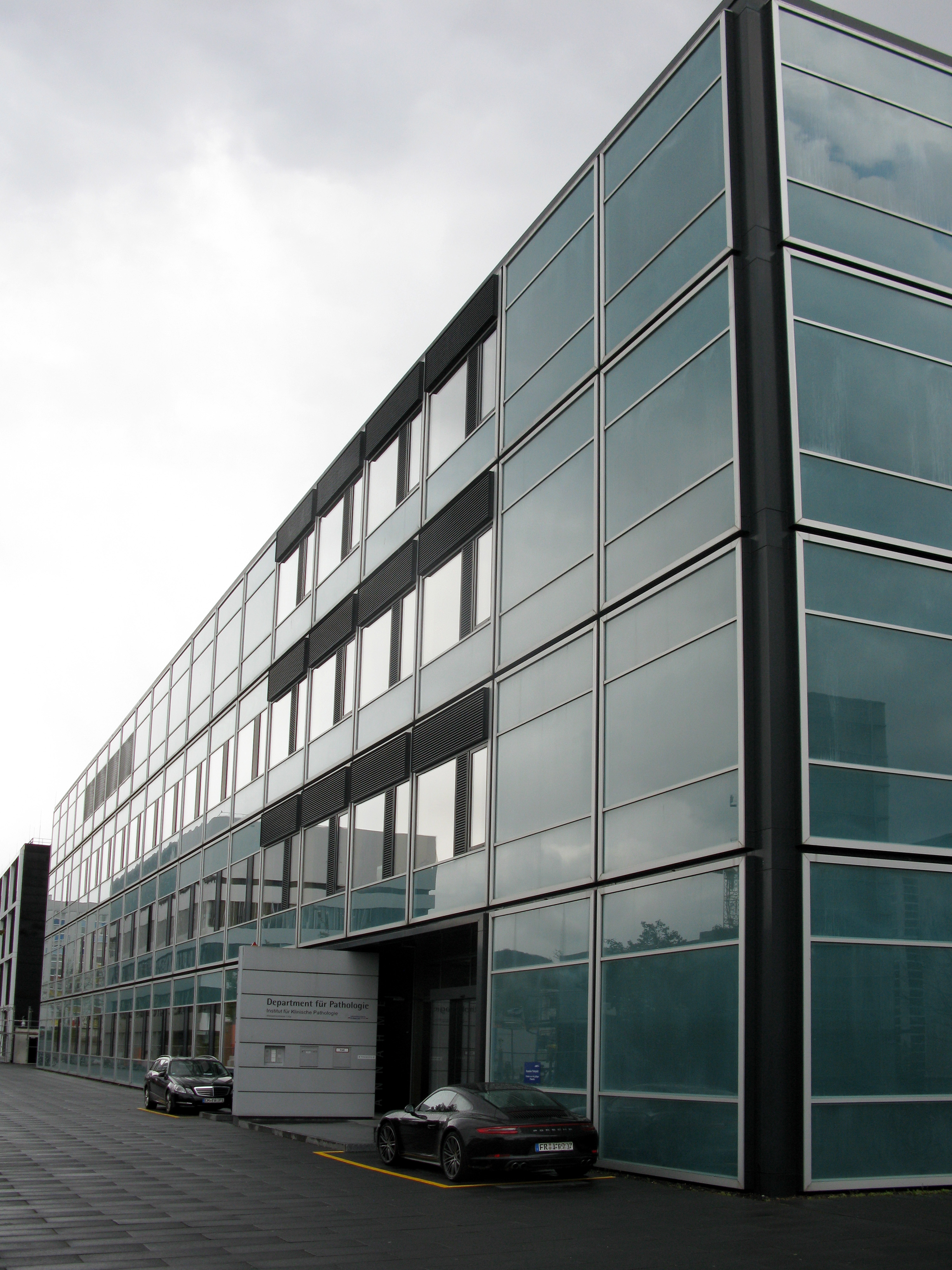
Institute for Pathology at the University Medical Center Freiburg.

The pre-clinical facilities and institutes, where students spend most of their time during the first two years of medical school, are located in the Institutsviertel just north of Freiburg's historical inner city. The clinical departments and research facilities are, for the most part, situated at the University Medical Center Freiburg, located a short walking distance from the Institutsviertel. The Dermatology Clinic and the Clinic for Psychiatry and Psychosomatic Medicine are both located in the Herdern district of Freiburg. Due to the proximity of the locations, all medical facilities can easily be reached by bicycle or public transportation.

== Student life and exchange programs ==
Of the 3,278 students enrolled at the Faculty of Medicine 60.7% are female and 10.4% of students are international students. In the MD program, 60.8% of students are female and 10.6% are international students. There are numerous student organizations, most of which are coordinated through the student association (Fachschaft).

The School of Medicine has many partner medical schools worldwide and offers exchange opportunities. Many of these over 50 programs are organized within the framework of the European Union's ERASMUS programme.

== Famous alumni and faculty ==
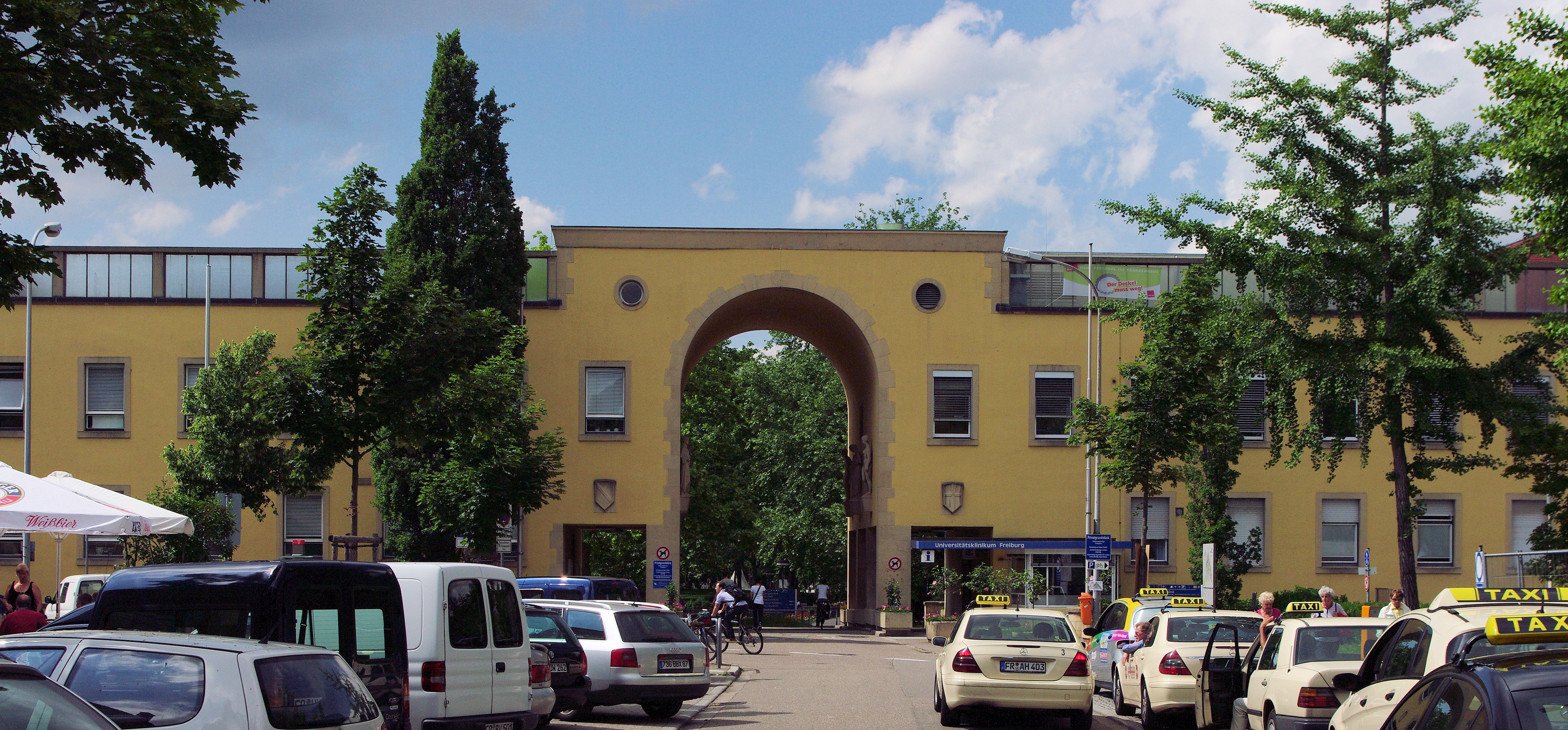
Main Entrance to the Medical Center campus.

The University of Freiburg Faculty of Medicine has a long history of medical education and research. Ten Nobel Prize winners in Physiology or Medicine are associated with the Faculty of Medicine, among them Róbert Bárány, Paul Ehrlich, Georges Köhler, Hans Adolf Krebs, Hans Spemann, and Harald zur Hausen.

In addition, many other distinguished medical researchers have studied or taught at the University of Freiburg: Ludwig Aschoff, Theodor Bilharz, Vincenz Czerny, Karl Herxheimer, Adolph Kussmaul, Paul Langerhans, Otto Schirmer, or Otto Heinrich Warburg are just a few of the renowned scientists and physicians.

Four current professors of the Faculty of Medicine are winners of the Gottfried Wilhelm Leibniz Prize, the highest German research award, endowed with 2.5 million EUR.

For a more complete list of notable alumni and faculty, see People associated with the University of Freiburg.

== See also ==
- University of Freiburg
- University Medical Center Freiburg
- Freiburg im Breisgau
- List of medical schools
