= Cerebral hyperperfusion syndrome =

Dysregulated cerebral blood flow

Cerebral hyperperfusion syndrome, also known as reperfusion syndrome, is a dysregulated state of cerebral blood flow following the restoration of arterial blood flow to the brain, usually following treatment of carotid artery stenosis. Risk factors include hypertension, particularly high blood pressures in the first few days following revascularization and bilateral stenosis.

== Symptoms ==
The first symptom is usually severe headache, and a headache in the setting of recent carotid endarterectomy or carotid stenting should prompt a return to the hospital and close attention by clinicians. Symptoms may progress to seizures and coma in severe cases.

== Treatment ==
Treatment is control of the blood pressure, often with continuous intravenous antihypertensives medicines in the intensive care setting. Seizures may require treatment with anti-seizure medication.
