= Transient ischemic attack =

Minor form of stroke

- Other names: Mini-stroke, mild stroke
- Specialty: Neurology, Vascular surgery
- Prognosis: Survival rate 91% (to hospital discharge); 67.2% (five years)

A transient ischemic attack (TIA), commonly known as mini-stroke, is a temporary, or transient, stroke with noticeable symptoms that end within 24 hours. A TIA causes the same symptoms of stroke, such as weakness or numbness on one side of the body, sudden dimming or loss of vision, difficulty speaking or understanding language, and slurred speech.

All forms of stroke, including a TIA, result from a disruption in blood flow to the central nervous system. A TIA is caused by a temporary disruption in blood flow to the brain, or cerebral blood flow (CBF). The primary difference between a major stroke and a TIA's minor stroke is how much tissue death (infarction) can be detected afterwards through medical imaging. While a TIA must by definition be associated with symptoms, strokes can also be asymptomatic or silent. In a silent stroke, also known as a silent cerebral infarct (SCI), there is permanent infarction detectable on imaging, but there are no immediately observable symptoms. The same person can have major strokes, minor strokes, and silent strokes, in any order.

The occurrence of a TIA is a risk factor for having a major stroke, and many people with TIA have a major stroke within 48 hours of the TIA. All forms of stroke are associated with increased risk of death or disability. Recognition that a TIA has occurred is an opportunity to start treatment, including medications and lifestyle changes, to prevent future strokes.

== Signs and symptoms ==
Signs and symptoms of TIA are widely variable and can mimic other neurologic conditions, making the clinical context and physical exam crucial in ruling in or out the diagnosis. The most common presenting symptoms of TIA are focal neurologic deficits, which can include, but are not limited to:

- Amaurosis fugax (painless, temporary loss of vision)
- One-sided facial droop
- One-sided motor weakness
- Diplopia (double vision)
- Problems with balance and spatial orientation or dizziness
- Visual field deficits, such as homonymous hemianopsia or monocular blindness
- Sensory deficits in one or more limbs and of the face
- Loss of ability to understand or express speech (aphasia)
- Difficulty with articulation of speech (dysarthria)
- Unsteady gait
- Difficulties with swallowing (dysphagia)

Numbness or weakness generally occurs on the opposite side of the body from the affected hemisphere of the brain.

A detailed neurologic exam, including a thorough cranial nerve exam, is important to identify these findings and to differentiate them from mimickers of TIA. Symptoms such as unilateral weakness, amaurosis fugax, and double vision have higher odds of representing TIA compared to memory loss, headache, and blurred vision. Below is a table of symptoms at presentation, and what percentage of the time they are seen in TIAs versus conditions that mimic TIA. In general, focal deficits make TIA more likely, but the absence of focal findings do not exclude the diagnosis, and further evaluation may be warranted if clinical suspicion for TIA is high (see "Diagnosis" section below).

=== TIA vis-à-vis mimics ===
Symptoms	% TIA mimics	% TIAs
Unilateral paresis	29.1	58
Memory loss/cognitive impairment	18 to 26	2 to 12
Headache	14.6 to 23	2 to 36
Blurred vision	21.8	5.2
Dysarthria	12.7	20.6
Hemianopsia	3.6	3.6
Transient monocular blindness	0	6
Diplopia	0	4.8

Non-focal symptoms such as amnesia, confusion, incoordination of limbs, unusual cortical visual symptoms (such as isolated bilateral blindness or bilateral positive visual phenomena), headaches and transient loss of consciousness are usually not associated with TIA, however patient assessment is still needed. Public awareness on the need to seek a medical assessment for these non-focal symptoms is also low, and can result in a delay by patients to seek treatment

Symptoms of TIAs can last on the order of minutes to one–two hours, but occasionally may last for a longer period of time. TIA is defined as ischemic events in the brain that last less than 24 hours. Given the variation in duration of symptoms, this definition holds less significance. A pooled study of 808 patients with TIAs from 10 hospitals showed that 60% lasted less than one hour, 71% lasted less than two hours, and 14% lasted greater than six hours. Importantly, patients with symptoms that last more than one hour are more likely to have permanent neurologic damage, making prompt diagnosis and treatment important to maximize recovery.

== Cause ==
The most common underlying pathology leading to TIA and stroke is a cardiac condition called atrial fibrillation, where poor coordination of heart contraction may lead to the formation of a clot in the atrial chamber that can become dislodged and travel to a cerebral artery. Unlike in stroke, the blood flow can become restored prior to infarction which leads to the resolution of neurologic symptoms. Another common culprit of TIA is an atherosclerotic plaque located in the common carotid artery, typically by the bifurcation between the internal and external carotids, that becomes an embolism to the brain vasculature similar to the clot in the prior example. A portion of the plaque can become dislodged and lead to embolic pathology in the cerebral vessels.

In-situ thrombosis, an obstruction that forms directly in the cerebral vasculature unlike the remote embolism previously mentioned, is another vascular occurrence with possible presentation as TIA. Also, carotid stenosis secondary to atherosclerosis narrowing the diameter of the lumen and thus limiting blood flow is another common cause of TIA. Individuals with carotid stenosis may present with TIA symptoms, thus labeled symptomatic, while others may not experience symptoms and be asymptomatic.

=== Risk factors ===
Risk factors associated with TIA are categorized as modifiable or non-modifiable. Non-modifiable risk factors include age greater than 55, sex, family history, genetics, and race/ethnicity. Modifiable risk factors include cigarette smoking, hypertension (elevated blood pressure), diabetes, hyperlipidemia, level of carotid artery stenosis (asymptomatic or symptomatic) and activity level. The modifiable risk factors are commonly targeted in treatment options to attempt to minimize risk of TIA and stroke.

== Pathogenesis ==
There are three major mechanisms of ischemia in the brain: embolism traveling to the brain, in situ thrombotic occlusion in the intracranial vessels supplying the parenchyma of the brain, and stenosis of vessels leading to poor perfusion secondary to flow-limiting diameter. Globally, the vessel most commonly affected is the middle cerebral artery. Embolisms can originate from multiple parts of the body.

Common mechanisms of stroke and TIA:

Stroke mechanism	Frequency	Pattern of infarcts	Number of infarcts
In situ thrombotic occlusion	Uncommon	Large subcortical; Sometimes with borderzone; Rarely, whole territory; Sometimes enlarging	Single
Artery to artery embolism	Common	Small cortical and subcortical	Multiple
Impaired clearance of emboli	Common	Small, scattered, alongside the borderzone region	Multiple
Branch occlusive disease	Common	Small subcortical, lacune-like	Single
Hemodynamic	Uncommon	Borderzone; may be without lesion	Multiple; None

== Diagnosis ==
The initial clinical evaluation of a suspected TIA involves obtaining a history and physical exam (including a neurological exam). History taking includes defining the symptoms and looking for mimicking symptoms as described above. Bystanders can be very helpful in describing the symptoms and giving details about when they started and how long they lasted. The time course (onset, duration, and resolution), precipitating events, and risk factors are particularly important.

The definition, and therefore the diagnosis, has changed over time. TIA was classically based on duration of neurological symptoms. The current widely accepted definition is called "tissue-based" because it is based on imaging, not time. The American Heart Association and the American Stroke Association (AHA/ASA) now define TIA as a brief episode of neurological dysfunction with a vascular cause, with clinical symptoms typically lasting less than one hour, and without evidence of significant infarction on imaging.

=== Laboratory workup ===
Laboratory tests should focus on ruling out metabolic conditions that may mimic TIA (e.g., low blood sugar), in addition to further evaluating a patient's risk factors for ischemic events. All patients should receive a complete blood count with platelet count, blood glucose, basic metabolic panel, prothrombin time/international normalized ratio, and activated partial thromboplastin time as part of their initial workup. These tests help with screening for bleeding or hypercoagulable conditions. Other lab tests, such as a full hypercoagulable state workup or serum drug screening, should be considered based on the clinical situation and factors, such as the age of the patient and family history. A fasting lipid panel is also appropriate to thoroughly evaluate the patient's risk for atherosclerotic disease and ischemic events in the future. Other lab tests may be indicated based on the history and presentation; such as obtaining inflammatory markers (erythrocyte sedimentation rate and C-reactive protein) to evaluate for giant cell arteritis (which can mimic a TIA) in those presenting with headaches and monocular blindness.

=== Cardiac rhythm monitoring ===
An electrocardiogram is necessary to rule out abnormal heart rhythms, such as atrial fibrillation, that can predispose patients to clot formation and embolic events. Hospitalized patients should be placed on heart rhythm telemetry, which is a continuous form of monitoring that can detect abnormal heart rhythms. Prolonged heart rhythm monitoring (such as with a Holter monitor or implantable heart monitoring) can be considered to rule out arrhythmias like paroxysmal atrial fibrillation that may lead to clot formation and TIAs, however this should be considered if other causes of TIA have not been found.

=== Imaging ===
According to guidelines from the American Heart Association and American Stroke Association Stroke Council, patients with TIA should have head imaging "within 24 hours of symptom onset, preferably with magnetic resonance imaging, including diffusion sequences". MRI is a better imaging modality for TIA than computed tomography (CT), as it is better able to pick up both new and old ischemic lesions than CT. CT, however, is more widely available and can be used particularly to rule out intracranial hemorrhage. Diffusion sequences can help further localize the area of ischemia and can serve as prognostic indicators. Presence of ischemic lesions on diffusion weighted imaging has been correlated with a higher risk of stroke after a TIA.

Vessels in the head and neck may also be evaluated to look for atherosclerotic lesions that may benefit from interventions, such as carotid endarterectomy. The vasculature can be evaluated through the following imaging modalities: magnetic resonance angiography (MRA), CT angiography (CTA), and carotid ultrasonography/transcranial doppler ultrasonography. Carotid ultrasonography is often used to screen for carotid artery stenosis, as it is more readily available, is noninvasive, and does not expose the person being evaluated to radiation. However, all of the above imaging methods have variable sensitivities and specificities, making it important to supplement one of the imaging methods with another to help confirm the diagnosis (for example: screen for the disease with ultrasonography, and confirm with CTA). Confirming a diagnosis of carotid artery stenosis is important because the treatment for this condition, carotid endarterectomy, can pose significant risk to the patient, including heart attacks and strokes after the procedure. For this reason, the U.S. Preventive Services Task Force (USPSTF) "recommends against screening for asymptomatic carotid artery stenosis in the general adult population". This recommendation is for asymptomatic patients, so it does not necessarily apply to patients with TIAs as these may in fact be a symptom of underlying carotid artery disease (see "Causes and Pathogenesis" above). Therefore, patients who have had a TIA may opt to have a discussion with their clinician about the risks and benefits of screening for carotid artery stenosis, including the risks of surgical treatment of this condition.

Cardiac imaging can be performed if head and neck imaging do not reveal a vascular cause for the patient's TIA (such as atherosclerosis of the carotid artery or other major vessels of the head and neck). Echocardiography can be performed to identify patent foramen ovale (PFO), valvular stenosis, and atherosclerosis of the aortic arch that could be sources of clots causing TIAs, with transesophageal echocardiography being more sensitive than transthoracic echocardiography in identifying these lesions.

=== Differential diagnosis ===
Diagnosis	Findings
Brain tumor	Severe unilateral headache with nausea and vomiting
Central nervous system infection (e.g., meningitis, encephalitis)	Fever, headache, confusion, neck stiffness, nausea, vomiting, photophobia, change in mental status
Falls/trauma	Headache, confusion, bruising
Hypoglycemia	Confusion, weakness, diaphoresis
Migraines	Severe headaches with or without photophobia, younger age
Multiple sclerosis	Diplopia, limb weakness, paresthesia, urinary retention, optic neuritis
Seizure disorder	Confusion with or without loss of consciousness, urinary incontinence, tongue biting, tonic-clonic movements
Subarachnoid hemorrhage	Severe headache with sudden onset and photophobia
Vertigo (central or peripheral)	Generalized dizziness and diaphoresis with or without hearing loss

== Prevention ==
Although there is a lack of robust studies demonstrating the efficacy of lifestyle changes in preventing TIA, many medical professionals recommend them. These include:

- Avoiding smoking
- Cutting down on fats to help reduce the amount of plaque buildup
- Eating a healthy diet, including plenty of fruits and vegetables
- Limiting sodium in the diet, thereby reducing blood pressure
- Exercising regularly
- Moderating intake of alcohol, stimulants, sympathomimetics, etc.
- Maintaining a healthy weight

In addition, it is important to control any underlying medical conditions that may increase the risk of stroke or TIA, including:

- Hypertension
- High cholesterol
- Diabetes mellitus
- Atrial fibrillation

== Treatment ==
By definition, TIAs are transient, self-resolving, and do not cause permanent impairment. However, they are associated with an increased risk of subsequent ischemic strokes, which can be permanently disabling. Therefore, management centers on the prevention of future ischemic strokes and addressing any modifiable risk factors. The optimal regimen depends on the underlying cause of the TIA.

=== Lifestyle modification ===
Lifestyle changes have not been shown to reduce the risk of stroke after TIA. While no studies have looked at the optimal diet for secondary prevention of stroke, some observational studies have shown that a Mediterranean diet can reduce stroke risk in patients without cerebrovascular disease. A Mediterranean diet is rich in fruits, vegetables, and whole grains, and limited in red meats and sweets. Vitamin supplementation is not useful in secondary stroke prevention.

=== Antiplatelet medications ===
The antiplatelet medications, aspirin and clopidogrel, are both recommended for secondary prevention of stroke after high-risk TIAs. The clopidogrel can generally be stopped after 10 to 21 days. An exception is TIAs due to blood clots originating from the heart, in which case anticoagulants are generally recommended. After TIA or minor stroke, aspirin therapy has been shown to reduce the short-term risk of recurrent stroke by 60–70%, and the long-term risk of stroke by 13%.The typical therapy may include aspirin alone, a combination of aspirin plus extended-release dipyridamole, or clopidogrel alone. Clopidogrel and aspirin have similar efficacies and side effect profiles. Clopidogrel is more expensive and has a slightly decreased risk of GI bleed. Another antiplatelet, ticlopidine, is rarely used due to increased side effects.

=== Anticoagulant medications ===
Anticoagulants may be started if the TIA is thought to be attributable to atrial fibrillation. Atrial fibrillation is an abnormal heart rhythm that may cause the formation of blood clots that can travel to the brain, resulting in TIAs or ischemic strokes. Atrial fibrillation increases stroke risk by five times, and is thought to cause 10-12% of all ischemic strokes in the US. Anticoagulant therapy can decrease the relative risk of ischemic stroke in those with atrial fibrillation by 67% Direct acting oral anticoagulants (DOACs), such as apixaban, are as effective as warfarin while also conferring a lower risk of bleeding. Generally, anticoagulants and antiplatelets are not used in combination, as they result in increased bleeding risk without a decrease in stroke risk. However, combined antiplatelet and anticoagulant therapy may be warranted if the patient has symptomatic coronary artery disease in addition to atrial fibrillation.

Sometimes, myocardial infarction ("heart attack") may lead to the formation of a blood clot in one of the chambers of the heart. If this is thought to be the cause of the TIA, people may be temporarily treated with warfarin or another anticoagulant to decrease the risk of future stroke.

=== Blood pressure control ===
Blood pressure control may be indicated after a TIA to reduce the risk of ischemic stroke. About 70% of patients with recent ischemic stroke are found to have hypertension, defined as systolic blood pressure (SBP) > 140 mmHg or diastolic blood pressure (DBP) > 90 mmHg. Until the first half of the 2010s, blood pressure goals have generally been SBP < 140 mmHg and DBP < 90 mmHg. However, newer studies suggest that a goal of SBP <130 mmHg may confer even greater benefit. Blood pressure control is often achieved using diuretics or a combination of diuretics and angiotensin converter enzyme inhibitors, although the optimal treatment regimen depends on the individual.

Studies that evaluated the application of blood pressure‐lowering drugs in people who had a TIA or stroke concluded that this type of medication helps to reduce the possibility of a recurrent stroke, a major vascular event, and dementia. The effects achieved in stroke recurrence were mainly obtained through the ingestion of angiotensin-converting enzyme (ACE) inhibitor or a diuretic.

=== Cholesterol control ===
There is inconsistent evidence regarding the effect of LDL-cholesterol levels on stroke risk after TIA. Elevated cholesterol may increase ischemic stroke risk while decreasing the risk of hemorrhagic stroke. While its role in stroke prevention is unclear, statin therapy has been shown to reduce all-cause mortality and may be recommended after TIA.

=== Diabetes control ===
Diabetes mellitus increases the risk of ischemic stroke by 1.5–3.7 times, and may account for at least 8% of first ischemic strokes. While intensive glucose control can prevent certain complications of diabetes, such as kidney damage and retinal damage, there has previously been little evidence that it decreases the risk of stroke or death. However, data from 2017 suggests that metformin, pioglitazone and semaglutide may reduce stroke risk.

=== Surgery ===
If the TIA affects an area that is supplied by the carotid arteries, a carotid ultrasound scan may demonstrate stenosis, or narrowing, of the carotid artery. For people with extra-cranial carotid stenosis, if 70-99% of the carotid artery is clogged, carotid endarterectomy can decrease the five-year risk of ischemic stroke by approximately half. For those with extra-cranial stenosis between 50 and 69%, carotid endarterectomy decreases the 5-year risk of ischemic stroke by about 16%. For those with extra-cranial stenosis less than 50%, carotid endarterectomy does not reduce stroke risk and may, in some cases, increase it. The effectiveness of carotid endarterectomy or carotid artery stenting in reducing stroke risk in people with intracranial carotid artery stenosis is unknown.

In carotid endarterectomy, a surgeon makes an incision in the neck, opens up the carotid artery, and removes the plaque occluding the blood vessel. The artery may then be repaired by adding a graft from another vessel in the body or a woven patch. In patients who undergo carotid endarterectomy after a TIA or minor stroke, the 30-day risk of death or stroke is 7%.

Carotid artery stenting is a less invasive alternative to carotid endarterectomy for people with extra-cranial carotid artery stenosis. In this procedure, the surgeon makes a small cut in the groin and threads a small flexible tube, called a catheter, into the patient's carotid artery. A balloon is inflated at the site of stenosis, opening up the clogged artery to allow for increased blood flow to the brain. To keep the vessel open, a small wire mesh coil, called a stent, may be inflated along with the balloon. The stent remains in place, and the balloon is removed.

For people with symptomatic carotid stenosis, carotid endarterectomy is associated with fewer perioperative deaths or strokes than carotid artery stenting. Following the procedure, there is no difference in effectiveness if you compare carotid endarterectomy and carotid stenting procedures, however, endarterectomy is often the procedure of choice as it is a safer procedure and is often effective in the longer term for preventing recurrent stroke. For people with asymptomatic carotid stenosis, the increased risk of stroke or death during the stenting procedure compared to an endarterectomy is less certain.

People who undergo carotid endarterectomy or carotid artery stenting for stroke prevention are medically managed with antiplatelets, statins, and other interventions as well.

== Prognosis ==
Without treatment, the risk of an ischemic stroke in the three months after a TIA is about 20% with the greatest risk occurring within two days of the TIA. Other sources cite that 10% of TIAs will develop into a stroke within 90 days, half of which will occur in the first two days following the TIA. Treatment and preventative measures after a TIA (for example treating elevated blood pressure) can reduce the subsequent risk of an ischemic stroke by about 80%. The risk of a stroke occurring after a TIA can be predicted using the ABCD² score. One limitation of the ABCD² score is that it does not reliably predict the level of carotid artery stenosis, which is a major cause of stroke in TIA patients. The patient's age is the most reliable risk factor in predicting any level of carotid stenosis in transient ischemic attack. The ABCD^{2} score is no longer recommended for triage (to decide between outpatient management versus hospital admission) of those with a suspected TIA due to these limitations.

== Epidemiology ==
With the difficulty in diagnosing a TIA due to its nonspecific symptoms of neurologic dysfunction at presentation and a differential diagnosis including many mimics, the exact incidence of the disease is unclear. It was estimated to have an incidence of approximately 200,000 to 500,000 cases per year in the US in the early 2000s according to the American Heart Association. TIA incidence trends similarly to stroke, such that incidence varies with age, gender, and different race/ethnicity populations. Associated risk factors include age greater than or equal to 60, blood pressure greater than or equal to 140 systolic or 90 diastolic, and comorbid diseases, such as diabetes, hypertension, atherosclerosis, and atrial fibrillation. It is thought that approximately 15 to 30 percent of strokes have a preceding TIA episode associated.
