= Carotid stenting =

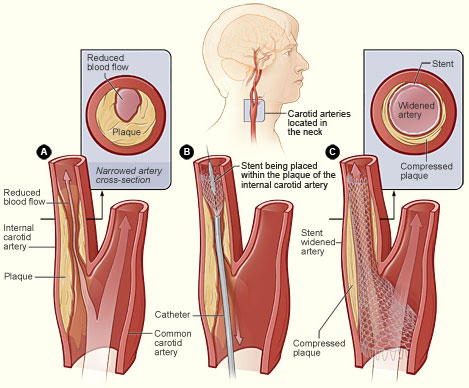
- Illustration showing the process of carotid artery stenting
- Specialty: Vascular surgery
- ICD-9-CM: 00.55, 00.63, 39.90,

Carotid artery stenting is an endovascular procedure where a stent is deployed within the lumen of the carotid artery to treat narrowing of the carotid artery and decrease the risk of stroke. It is used to treat narrowing of the carotid artery in high-risk patients, when carotid endarterectomy is considered too risky.

== Uses ==
Carotid stenting is used to reduce the risk of stroke associated with carotid artery stenosis. Carotid stenosis can have no symptoms, or have symptoms such as transient ischemic attacks (TIAs) or strokes.

While historically endarterectomy has been the treatment for carotid stenosis, stenting is an alternative intervention for patients who are not candidates for surgery. High risk factors for endarterectomy, which would favor stenting instead, include medical comorbidities (severe heart disease, heart failure, severe lung disease) and anatomic features (contralateral carotid occlusion, radiation therapy to the neck, prior ipsilateral carotid artery surgery, intra-thoracic or intracranial carotid disease) that would make surgery difficult and risky.

== Reasons to avoid ==
While rates of stroke and death after both surgery and stenting are low, rates of stroke and death after stenting may be higher than with endartererectomy, particularly for transfemoral stenting in patients over age 70.

== Procedure ==
Carotid stenting involves the placement of a stent across the stenosis in the carotid artery. It can be performed under general or local anesthesia.

The stent may be placed from the femoral artery, radial artery, or from the common carotid artery at the base of the neck. Critical steps in both approaches are vascular access, crossing the stenosis with a wire, deploying a stent across the lesion, and removing the vascular access. A number of other steps may or may not be performed, including the use of a cerebral protection device, pre- or post-stent balloon angioplasty and cerebral angiography.

=== Trans-femoral carotid stenting ===
The trans-femoral route is the traditional approach to carotid stenting. The vast majority of these procedures are performed under local anesthesia. In this technique, puncture of the common femoral artery is used to gain access to the arterial system. Wire and sheath are advanced through the aorta to the common carotid artery on the side to be treated. Flow reversal or filter cerebral protection may be used. The procedure is typically performed percutaneously.

=== Trans-carotid artery revascularization ===
Trans-carotid artery stenting involves a surgical incision at the base of the neck over the common carotid artery. It is performed under either local or general anesthesia. Wire access is obtained at that location and used to deliver the stent to the internal carotid artery. Cerebral protection is usually obtained by flow reversal - the common carotid artery is clamped, and arterial blood from the internal carotid is run through a filter and returned to a femoral vein during the highest risk portions of the procedure.

=== Trans-radial carotid stenting ===
The trans-radial route has been introduced as an alternative in the past few years. The vast majority of these procedures are performed under local anesthesia. In this technique, puncture of the radial artery is used to gain access to the arterial system. Wire and sheath are advanced through the aorta to the common carotid artery on the side to be treated. Flow reversal or filter cerebral protection may be used. The procedure is typically performed percutaneously.

== Recovery and outcomes ==
Recovery after carotid artery stenting depends not only on the presence of complications during the procedure, but also on the presence of symptoms at the time of arrival to the hospital. Asymptomatic patients typically leave the hospital in 0–1 days. The blood pressure is kept at a goal below 140 mmHg systolic. Elevated blood pressure in the 2–10 days post-operatively may lead to reperfusion syndrome.

The most feared short-term complication of any stroke prevention procedure on the carotid artery is stroke itself. Patients must still be carefully selected for surgery or stenting in order to reduce the risks related to the procedure and ensure the long-term benefit after such intervention. Other short-term complications might include bleeding, infection and heart problems such as myocardial infarction related to anesthesia.

Late complications such as recurrent stenosis may occur, and surveillance with duplex ultrasound or CT-Angiography may be performed.

The risk-reduction from intervention for carotid stenosis (stenting or endarterectomy) is greatest when the indication for intervention is symptoms (i.e., the patient is symptomatic) - typically stroke or TIA. A new generation of double-layer stents is currently being developed to reduce the risk of stroke during or after the procedure. There is insufficient evidence to say that stenting or endarterectomy is better for symptomatic patients.

Angioplasty and carotid stenting in patients with asymptomatic carotid atherosclerotic stenosis should not be performed except in the context of randomized clinical trials.
