= Abdominal angina =

Abdominal pain

- Other names: Intestinal angina
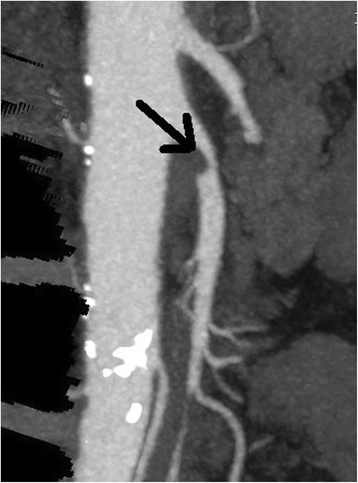
- CT angiogram demonstrating stenosis of the superior mesenteric artery.
- Specialty: General surgery

Abdominal angina is abdominal pain after eating caused by a reduction of blood flow to the celiac trunk, superior mesenteric arteries (SMA), inferior mesenteric artery (IMA), or the surrounding organs. Symptoms include abdominal pain, weight loss, diarrhea, nausea, vomiting, and an aversion or fear of eating caused by the pain associated with eating.

Abdominal angina is caused by obstruction or stenosis of the inferior mesenteric artery, celiac trunk, or superior mesenteric artery. Gender, age, smoking, hypertension, diabetes, and hyperlipidemia are risk factors for abdominal angina. The digestive tract relies on the celiac, superior mesenteric, and inferior mesenteric arteries for blood flow. Abdominal pain occurs when these arteries fail to provide adequate blood flow.

Abdominal angina is diagnosed using imaging to identify stenosis. Differential diagnoses include GERD, dietary sensitivities, constipation, pancreatitis, abdominal abscess, appendicitis, irritable bowel syndrome, gastroenteritis, hepatitis, and gastrointestinal system inflammation. Chronic mesenteric ischemia requires surgical revascularization and treatment like stents, transaortic endarterectomy, or bypassing the arteries.

Abdominal angina often has a one-year delay between symptoms and treatment, leading to complications like malnutrition or bowel infarction. Abdominal angina is more prevalent in females with a 3:1 ratio, and the average age of onset is 60 years. Abdominal angina was first described by Dr. Baccelli in 1918 as lower abdominal pain after eating.

== Signs and symptoms ==
Symptoms of abdominal angina include postprandial abdominal pain, weight loss, diarrhea, nausea, vomiting, and an aversion or fear of eating caused by the pain associated with eating.

Abdominal angina usually starts 30 minutes after eating and persists for one to three hours. Individuals typically express the pain as a dull ache by clenching their fists over the epigastrium (Levine sign).

Sometimes people may reduce their caloric intake in an attempt to decrease pain which can lead to weight loss. There may also be changes in bowel habits, most commonly diarrhea from malabsorption or rarely constipation.

== Causes ==
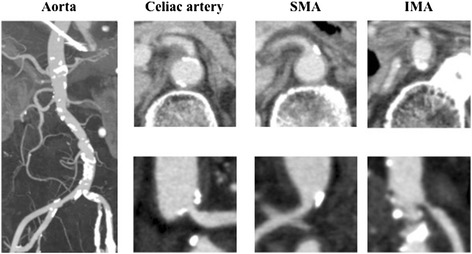
Enhanced computed tomography showing severe atherosclerosis of the arteries. The aorta shows broad calcifications, and the celiac artery shows moderate stenosis, although the lumen of the superior mesenteric artery was relatively patent. In addition, stenosis of the inferior mesenteric artery was very severe.

Abdominal angina is caused by obstruction or stenosis of the inferior mesenteric artery (IMA), celiac trunk, or superior mesenteric artery (SMA). More than 95% of abdominal angina is caused by stenosis of the splanchnic arteries due to local atherosclerosis. The occlusion mainly affects the ostia or the last few centimetres of the mesenteric arteries.

In rare cases, compression of the celiac trunk by the diaphragm's arcuate ligament can result in isolated occlusive disease (also known as "median arcuate ligament syndrome"). Other less common causes of vascular obstruction include vasculitis, chronic mesenteric venous thrombosis, fibromuscular dysplasia, radiation enteritis, and, in rare cases, extrinsic obstruction or vessel encasement by a tumour.

=== Risk factors ===
Approximately 82% of those with abdominal angina have diabetes. Hyperlipidemia, which frequently causes peripheral vascular disease, raises the risk of abdominal angina by 70% and correlates with the atherosclerotic aspect of the disease process. Smoking plays a part in the development of abdominal angina. Smokers account for 75% to 80% of all abdominal angina cases. Age also plays a role. The average age of onset is more than 60. This data corresponds with the vascular damage that occurs with age. Gender appears to play a role in the development of abdominal angina. Women are threefold more likely to develop abdominal angina than men. Hypertension is another known risk factor. Six out of ten of those with abdominal angina will be hypertensive.

== Mechanisms ==
Blood supply of the gastrointestinal system.

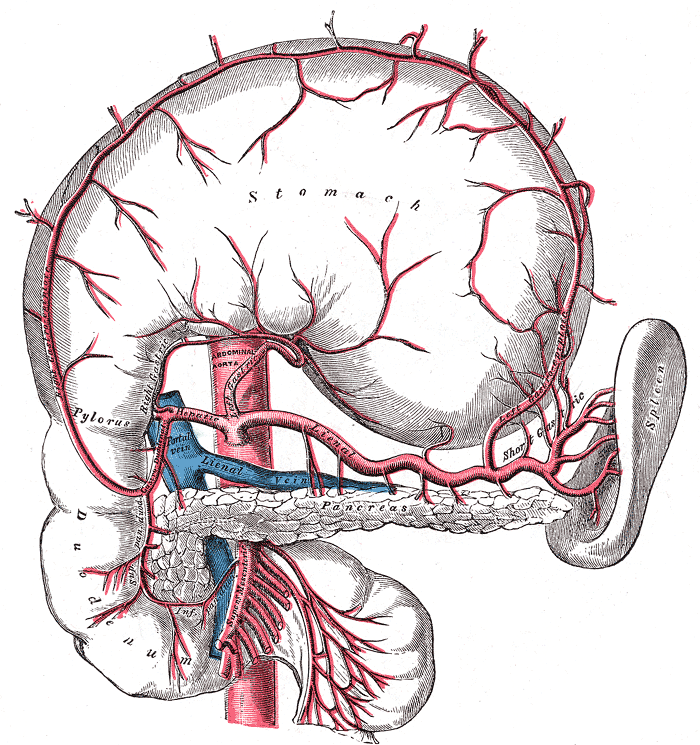
The celiac artery and its branches.

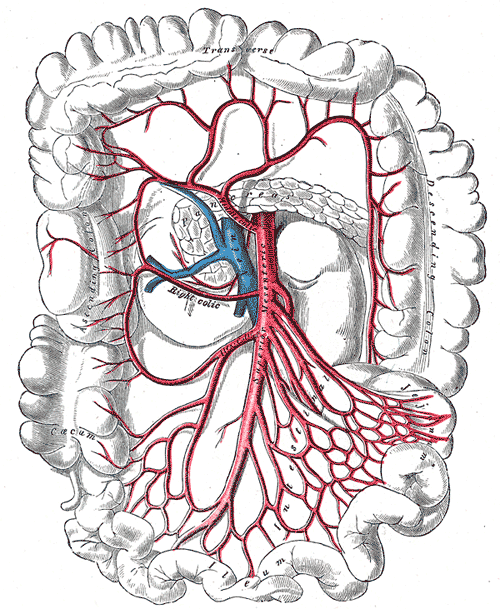
The superior mesenteric artery and its branches.

The inferior mesenteric artery and its branches.

The celiac, superior mesenteric, and inferior mesenteric arteries are the three primary blood vessels that support the digestive tract. Abdominal pain happens because the digestive processes require increased blood flow to the stomach. The stenotic or occluded artery cannot give adequate blood flow. The pain is caused by ischemia of the affected tissues, which do not receive the essential perfusion to perform digestion.

The gastrointestinal system has significant collateral circulation, which may worsen in cases of vascular stenosis. Along with the protection provided by collateral blood flow, the colon possesses various other mechanisms to prevent ischemia, such as opening of all mesenteric capillaries, redistribution of intramural blood supply, and improved oxygen extraction. But if those are exceeded, these defensive mechanisms become overwhelmed and no longer provide protection.

Some people with a single-vessel lesion experience symptoms, while others with up to three lesions are asymptomatic; hence, the number of arteries required to cause symptoms of ischemia is debatable. The occurrence of angina is determined by factors besides the number of arteries affected, such as the location of the lesion, the time of advancement of the lesions, and concurrent disorders that impact angiogenesis.

== Diagnosis ==
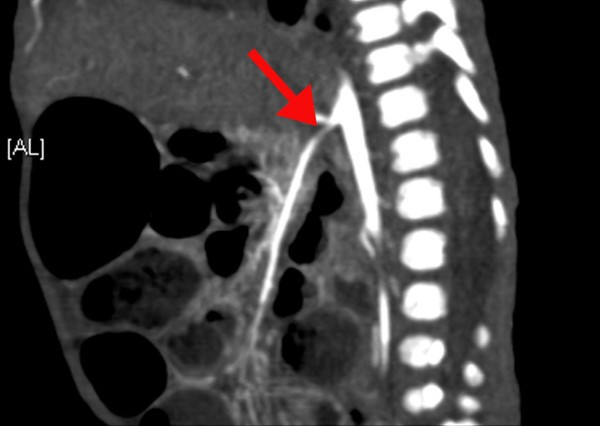
A computed tomography angiogram showing stenosis of the superior mesenteric artery (arrow).

Abdominal angina is diagnosed by identifying stenosis with imaging. Since the symptoms of abdominal angina overlap with various other disorders, other causes of symptoms are ruled out as a part of the diagnostic process. Gastric ulcers, abdominal aortic aneurysms, and gastrointestinal cancers can have similar symptoms and can be ruled out by esophagogastroduodenoscopy, CT scans, or MR angiogram. Other differential diagnoses include GERD, dietary or food sensitivities, constipation, pancreatitis, abdominal abscess, appendicitis, irritable bowel syndrome, gastroenteritis, hepatitis, and inflammation of the gastrointestinal system. Duplex ultrasound, MR angiography, angiography, and computed tomography angiography can be used to help confirm the diagnosis of abdominal angina. Duplex ultrasound may be used to screen for abdominal angina but is not ideal for visualizing stenosis. Angiography, MR angiography, or CT angiography can be used to further visualize the celiac and mesenteric arteries.

== Treatment and outlook ==
Abdominal angina is treated differently based on the severity and cause. Antibiotics are often used in the case of colonic ischemia as there is often cooccurring infections. When possible the underlying cause of abdominal angina may be treated. This includes medications to treat heart failure, hypertension, dysrhythmia, or hyperlipidemia.

The most effective treatment for chronic mesenteric ischemia is surgical revascularization and percutaneous treatment such as stents. Surgical treatment may include transaortic endarterectomy of the effected arteries or creating a retrograde or anterograde bypass in the arteries.

Similarly to other vascular disorders, abdominal angina can be slowly progressive. There is often a one-year delay between the onset of symptoms and treatment. Complications of abdominal angina such as malnutrition or bowel infarction can cause increased morbidity and mortality in this population.

== Epidemiology and history ==
The prevalence of abdominal angina is unknown. It is more prevalent in females than males with a ratio of 3:1. The mean age of those affected is 60 years old.

The term "abdominal angina" was first used by Dr. Baccelli in 1918. He used the term to describe a group of patients who had developed lower abdominal pain after eating. In 1936 Dunphy made the connection between abdominal angina and gastrointestinal necrosis. 21 years later Mikkelson introduced a surgery which could help restore blood flow to the gastrointestinal system. Although there was early interest in research, there has been very little subsequent research in the years following.

== See also ==
- Intestinal ischemia
- Ischemic colitis
