= Endarterectomy =

Surgical removal of plaque within arteries

- Endarterectomy- plaque removal by surgical excision and closure
- ICD-9-CM: 38.1
- MeSH: D004691

Endarterectomy is a surgical procedure to remove the atheromatous plaque material, or blockage, in the lining of an artery constricted by the buildup of deposits. It is carried out by separating the plaque from the arterial wall. These procedures are commonly performed in the carotid arteries, pulmonary arteries, coronary arteries, branches of the aorta, and femoral arteries. The goal is for the patient to have restored circulation and avoid complications associated with a lack of oxygen by removing the plaque.

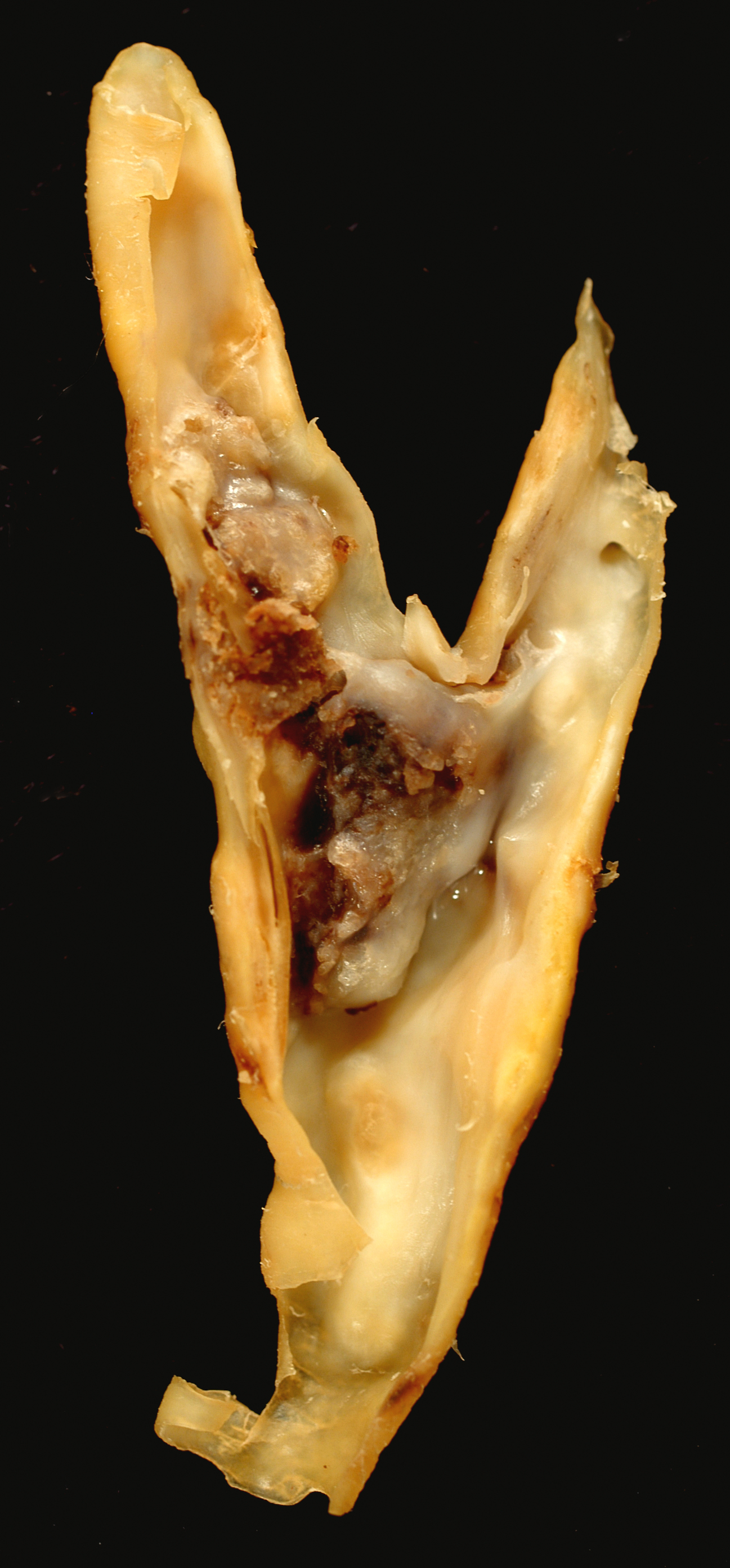
Atherosclerotic plaque from a carotid endarterectomy specimen

Atherosclerosis is a major reason why patients will require an endarterectomy. The accumulation of cholesterol on the interior wall of the artery forms the plaque. Some of the risk factors associated with atherosclerosis are genetics, sedentary lifestyle, obesity, poor diet, smoking, hypertension, and diabetes mellitus.

It was first performed on a subsartorial artery in 1946 by a Portuguese surgeon, João Cid dos Santos, at the University of Lisbon. In 1951, E. J. Wylie, an American, performed it on the abdominal aorta. The first successful reconstruction of the carotid artery was performed by Carrea, Molins, and Murphy in Argentina, later in the same year.

== Indications ==
Common indications for an endarterectomy depend on the location.

For carotid endarterectomies, indications include carotid stenosis causing symptoms, such as a stroke or a transient ischemic attack. Other symptoms include sudden weakness/numbness in the face or limbs, slurred speech, vision loss, confusion, and loss of balance. It should also be considered if the patient is asymptomatic, but the carotid artery is 70-99% occluded or narrowed. This can be determined based on ultrasound imaging of the flow of blood through the arteries.

Pulmonary artery endarterectomies are indicated if the patient has chronic thromboembolic pulmonary hypertension (CTEPH), which is symptomatic pulmonary hypertension due to surgically accessible thromboembolic disease. This procedure was refined by Jamieson over the last two decades and his technique has become the standard worldwide.

Coronary artery endarterectomies were first introduced by Bailey in the 1950s prior to the advent of coronary artery bypass surgery to help patients with angina and coronary artery disease. It is still used today as an adjunct with coronary artery bypass surgery for high risk patients who are older, have advanced coronary artery disease, or other comorbidities.

Endarterectomies for the branches of the aorta are done treat aortoiliac peripheral arterial disease and chronic mesenteric ischemia. Aortoiliac peripheral arterial disease is caused by atherosclerosis in the aorta and iliac arteries, reducing blood flow to the pelvic organs, buttocks, and lower extremities. This can cause diminished pulses and weakness in the lower extremities, along with sexual dysfunction. Chronic mesenteric ischemia is due to plaque formation in the mesenteric arteries, affecting blood flow to the intestines, presenting with abdominal cramping after meals, weight loss, and gastrointestinal dysfunction.

Femoral artery endarterectomies are performed in the common femoral artery specifically. They are indicated for symptomatic pain from peripheral artery disease that hinders quality of life for the patient, like cramping when walking a certain distance, chronic limb-threatening ischemia (CLTI), or acute on chronic limb ischemia.

== Procedure Overview ==
An incision is made over the area of interest. Once the incision is made, proper handling of the tissue and nerves overlying the artery is important to minimize complications. The goal is to visualize the section of the affected artery in the simplest way possible. Upon visualization of the affected artery, the next step is to obtain blood vessel control. It is important to gain proximal and distal control of the vessel. This can be done by clamping the vessels, using balloon occlusion, or applying vessel loops.

An arteriotomy is made, which is a longitudinal incision made over the affected arterial segment, exposing the plaque. Following the arteriotomy, a plane is created between the plaque and the adventitia (the outer layer of the vessel). Dissect and remove the plaque by circumferentially removing the plaque. Once healthy artery is seen, the plaque can be removed easily by teasing out or cutting it from the arterial wall. Ideally, the plaque is removed as a single piece.

Once the plaque is removed, the goal is to inspect and remove loose fibers and residual debris from the artery wall. The artery ideally should be smooth before blood flows through the vessel again. The artery incision is closed with sutures or patch angioplasty (more common), which involves using a synthetic fabric to close the artery wall.

After the procedure, most patients are started on aspirin for at least 3 months. Patients may also be started on additional antiplatelet therapy like clopidogrel and a statin to manage cholesterol.

== Contraindications ==
Contraindications are based on patient factors and anatomic factors. Severe comorbid conditions like dialysis-dependent renal failure, heart failure, severe coronary artery disease, steroid-dependent pulmonary disease, and age ≥80 years old are considered contraindications. Other contraindications include myocardial infarction in the last 6 months, severe pulmonary disease, contralateral carotid occlusion, and a common carotid artery lesion below the clavicle.

In these cases, alternative therapies such as medical management or stenting in the case of carotid arteries are preferred. Carotid artery stenting has improved over the last 20 years, but carotid endarterectomy is still considered safer due to the lower risk of periprocedural stroke or death, especially in patients older than 70 years old. Stenting is preferred in cases where the patient is younger, and the anatomy is more difficult navigate.

== Complications ==
Postoperative complications can range from localized to systemic after an endarterectomy. They are also dependent on where the endarterectomy was performed. In general, when making an incision, there is a risk for wound complications such as a hematoma (<5%) and infection (<1%), no matter the location of the incision.

For carotid endarterectomy, the risk of stroke (2–8%) by improper handling of the plaque being freed and sent to the arteries in the brain is the most serious complication. Cranial nerve injuries can also occur, affecting the hypoglossal, marginal mandibular, recurrent laryngeal, and spinal accessory nerves. Most cranial nerve injury complications are temporary, occurring 5–7% of the time, but <1% are permanent. There is also concern of hemodynamic instability after the procedure (20%), as the baroreceptors in the carotid sinus regulate blood pressure.

In the case of coronary artery endarterectomies, there is an increased risk of mortality (1.69 fold) and myocardial infarction (3.34 fold) when compared to coronary artery bypass graft alone. Other complications include arrhythmias, renal failure, prolonged ICU and hospital stays, and lower long term graft patency if a coronary artery bypass graft was performed as well.

For pulmonary endarterectomies, 10% of patients experience pulmonary edema from reperfusion of the lungs. This can range from mild hypoxemia to severe hemorrhagic edema. Patients have also had other complications like arrhythmias, pericardial effusions, and pleural effusions.

Femoral endarterectomies are associated with more local complications, occurring in 17% of patients. The local complications include hematomas, lymphatic leaks, pseudoaneurysms, and wound infections. Systemic complications occur in 15% of patients.
