= Carotid endarterectomy =

Surgical procedure

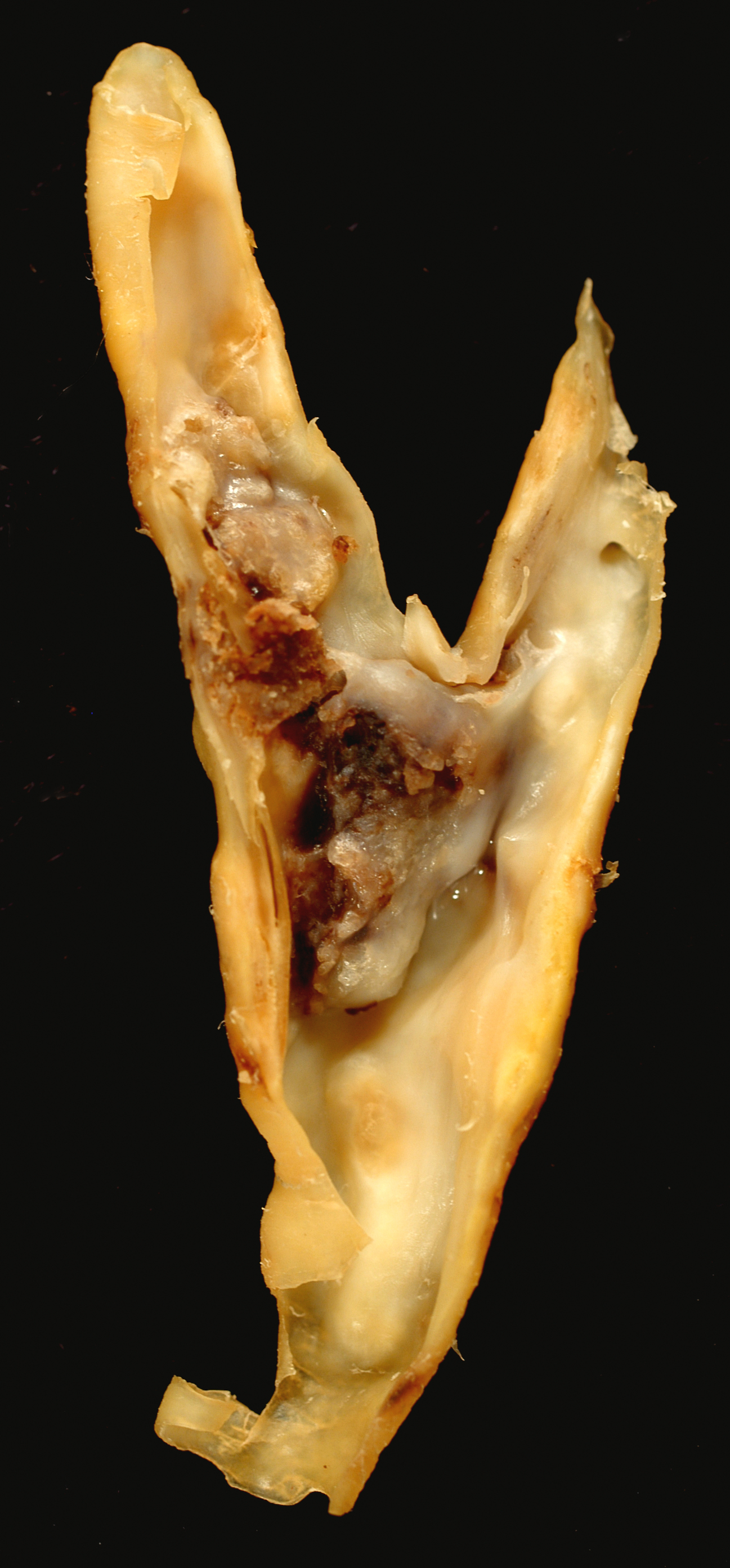
- Carotid endarterectomy specimen. The specimen is removed from within the lumen of the common carotid artery (bottom), and the internal carotid artery (left) and external carotid artery (right).
- ICD-9-CM: 38.1
- MeSH: D016894

Carotid endarterectomy is a surgical procedure used to reduce the risk of stroke from carotid artery stenosis (narrowing of the internal carotid artery). In an endarterectomy, the surgeon opens the artery and removes the plaque. The plaque forms and thickens the inner layer of the artery, or intima, hence the name of the procedure which simply means removal of part of the internal layers of the artery.

An alternative procedure is carotid stenting, which can also reduce the risk of stroke for some patients.

== Medical uses ==
Carotid endarterectomy is used to reduce the risk of strokes caused by carotid artery stenosis over time. Carotid stenosis can either have symptoms (i.e., be symptomatic), or be found by a doctor in the absence of symptoms (asymptomatic) - and the risk-reduction from endarterectomy is greater for symptomatic than asymptomatic patients.

Carotid endarterectomy itself can cause strokes, so to be of benefit in preventing strokes over time, the risks for combined 30-day mortality and stroke risk following surgery should be < 3% for asymptomatic people and ≤ 6% for symptomatic people.

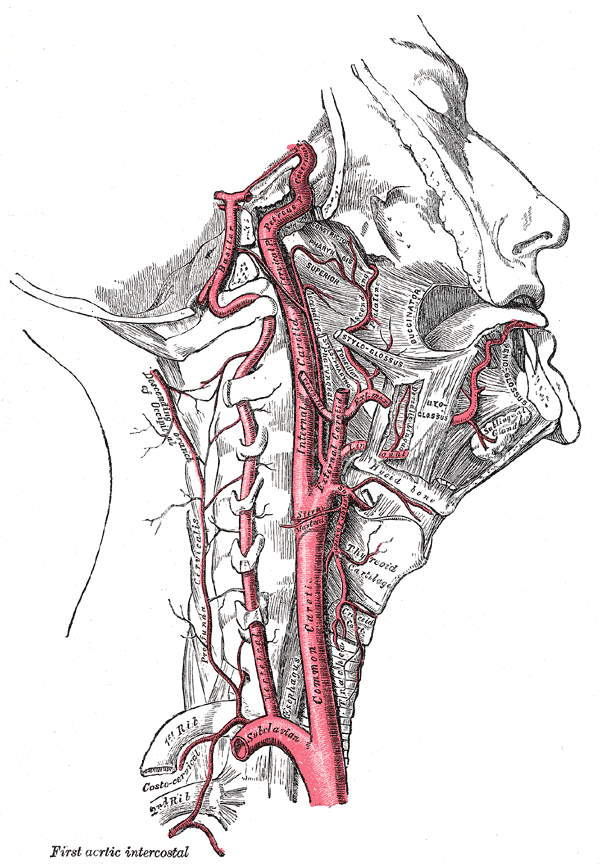
The carotid artery is the large vertical artery in red. The blood supply to the common carotid artery starts at the arch of the aorta (left) or the subclavian artery (right). The common carotid artery divides into the internal carotid artery and the external carotid artery. Plaque often builds up at that division, and a carotid endarterectomy cuts open the artery and removes the plaque.

Carotid endarterectomy does not treat symptoms of prior strokes. It is controversial if carotid endarterectomy can improve cognitive function in some patients.

=== Symptomatic ===
Symptomatic people have had either a stroke or transient ischemic attack or amaurosis fugax.

In symptomatic patients with a 70–99% stenosis, for every six people treated, one major stroke would be prevented at two years (i.e., a number needed to treat of six).

Unlike asymptomatic patients, symptomatic people with moderate carotid stenosis (50–69%) still benefit from endarterectomy, albeit to a lesser degree, with a number needed to treat of 22 at five years. Recent evidence demonstrated that unstable carotid atherosclerotic plaques are responsible for cerebral ischemic events and symptoms (stroke or transient ischemic attack) in these patients. In addition, co-morbidity adversely affects the outcome: people with multiple medical problems have a higher post-operative mortality rate and hence benefit less from the procedure. For maximum benefit people should be operated on soon after a stroke or transient ischemic attack, preferably within the first 2 weeks.

=== Asymptomatic ===
Asymptomatic people have narrowing of their carotid arteries, but have not experienced a transient ischemic attack or stroke. The annual risk of stroke in patients with asymptomatic carotid disease is between 1% and 2%, although some patients are considered to be at higher risk, such as those with ulcerated plaques. This low rate of stroke means that there is less potential stroke risk-reduction from endarterectomy for asymptomatic patients relative to symptomatic patients. However, for asymptomatic patients with severe carotid stenosis (80-99%), carotid endarterectomy plus treatment with a statin medicine and anti-platelet therapy does reduce stroke risk further than medication alone in the five years following surgery.

== Complications ==
The most feared complication of carotid endarterectomy is stroke. Risks of stroke at the time of surgery are higher for symptomatic (3–5%) than asymptomatic patients (1–3%).

Bleeding, infection, and cranial nerve injury are also risks at the time of surgery. Following surgery, a rare early complication is cerebral hyperperfusion syndrome, also known as reperfusion syndrome, which is associated with headache and high blood pressure following surgery.

Long term complications include restenosis of the endarterectomy bed, although the clinical significance of this is controversial in asymptomatic patients.

== Reasons to avoid ==
The procedure should be avoided when:

- There is complete internal carotid artery occlusion
- The person has a previous complete hemispheric stroke on the ipsilateral and complete cerebrovascular territory side severe neurologic deficits (NIHSS>15), because there is no brain tissue at risk for further stroke damage.
- People deemed unfit for the operation by the surgeon or anesthesiologist due to comorbidities.

High risk criteria for carotid endarterectomy include the following:

- Age ≥80 years
- Class III/IV congestive heart failure
- Class III/IV angina pectoris
- Left main or multi vessel coronary artery disease
- Need for open heart surgery within 30 days
- Left ventricular ejection fraction of ≤30%
- Recent (≤30 days) heart attack
- Severe lung disease or chronic obstructive pulmonary disease
- Severe renal disease
- High cervical (C2) or intrathoracic lesion
- Prior radical neck surgery or radiation therapy
- Contralateral carotid artery occlusion
- Prior ipsilateral carotid endarterectomy.
- Contralateral laryngeal nerve injury
- Tracheostoma

Carotid artery stenting is an alternative to carotid endarterectomy in cases where endarterectomy is considered too risky.

== Procedure ==
Illustration depicting a Carotid Endarterectomy

An incision is made on the midline side of the sternocleidomastoid muscle. The incision is between 5 and 10 cm (2.0 and 3.9 in) in length. The internal, common and external carotid arteries are carefully identified, controlled with vessel loops, and clamped. The lumen of the internal carotid artery is opened, and the atheromatous plaque substance removed. The artery is closed using suture with or without a patch to increase the size of the lumen. Hemostasis is achieved, and the overlying layers closed with suture. The skin can be closed with suture which may be visible or invisible (absorbable). Many surgeons place a temporary shunt to ensure blood supply to the brain during the procedure. The procedure may be performed under general or local anaesthesia. The latter allows for direct monitoring of neurological status by intra-operative verbal contact and neurological assessment. With general anaesthesia, indirect methods of assessing cerebral perfusion must be used. Electroencephalography (EEG), transcranial doppler analysis, cerebral oximetry, or carotid artery stump pressure monitoring can guide the placement of a shunt, or a shunt may be routinely used. At present there is still ongoing debate related to difference in outcome between local and general anaesthesia, and methods of determining the need for a shunt. However, excellent outcomes can be achieved by performing carotid endarterectomy under local anaesthesia.

== History ==
The endarterectomy procedure was developed and first done by the Portuguese surgeon Joao Cid dos Santos in 1946, when he operated on an occluded subsartorial artery, at the University of Lisbon. In 1951 an Argentinian surgeon repaired a carotid artery occlusion using a bypass procedure. The first endarterectomy was successfully performed by Michael DeBakey around 1953, at the Methodist Hospital in Houston, TX, although the technique was not reported in the medical literature until 1975. The first case to be recorded in the medical literature was in The Lancet in 1954; the surgeon was Felix Eastcott, a consultant surgeon and deputy director of the surgical unit at St Mary's Hospital, London, UK. Eastcott's procedure was not strictly an endarterectomy as we now understand it; he excised the diseased part of the artery and then resutured the healthy ends together. Carotid endarterectomy was finally shown to be effective in stroke prevention after a landmark clinical trial spearheaded by the Canadian clinical scientist Dr. Henry Barnett. Since then, evidence for its effectiveness in different patient groups has accumulated. In 2003 nearly 140,000 carotid endarterectomies were performed in the US, however, the number of procedures has continued to decrease over time.
