= Carotid ultrasonography =

Ultrasound-based diagnostic imaging technique

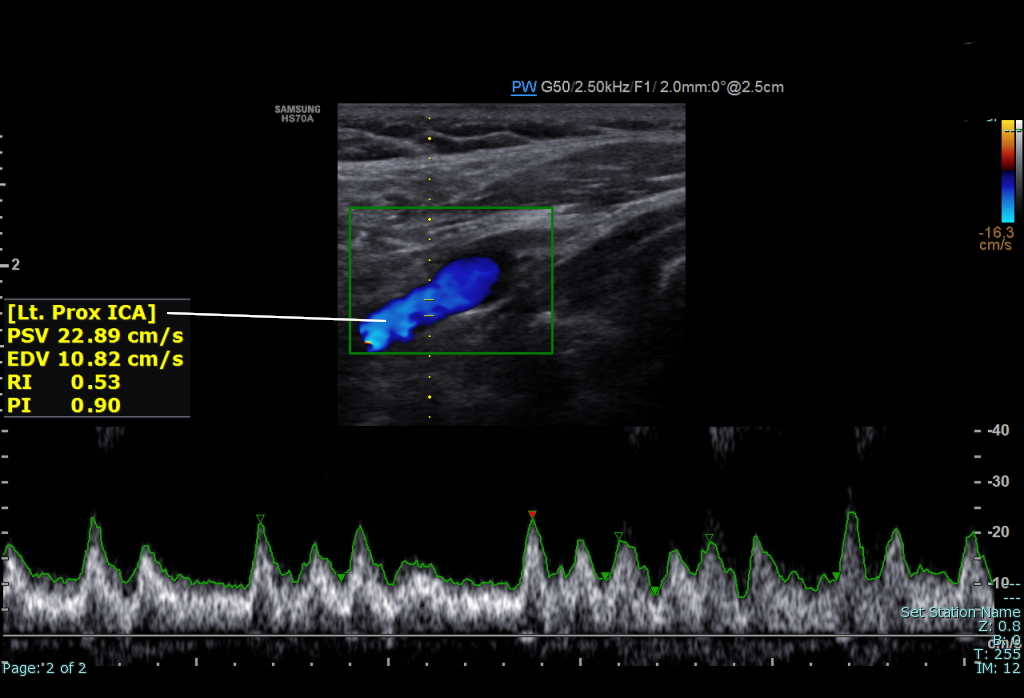
- Screenshot of a normal proximal internal carotid artery spectral Doppler
- Purpose: Imaging used to evaluate structural details and blood flow of the carotid arteries

Carotid ultrasonography is an ultrasound-based diagnostic imaging technique to evaluate structural details of the carotid arteries. Carotid ultrasound is used to diagnose carotid artery stenosis (CAS) and can assess atherosclerotic plaque morphology and characteristics. Carotid duplex and contrast-enhanced ultrasound are two of the most common imaging techniques used to evaluate carotid artery disease.

== Medical Uses ==
Carotid ultrasound is a low-cost, noninvasive, and accurate diagnostic imaging modality used to evaluate diseases of the carotid arteries. It is most often used to diagnose carotid artery stenosis, a form of atherosclerosis, and has the capability to assess plaque morphology and characteristics. Carotid artery stenosis is a major risk factor for stroke, and risk assessment of atherosclerotic carotid plaques is a critical component of stroke prevention. Advances in imaging have allowed for risk stratification including degree of stenosis and how vulnerable the atherosclerotic plaque is to rupture. Other plaque features that contribute to stroke risk and can be evaluated by imaging are: intraplaque hemorrhage, plaque ulceration and neovascularization, fibrous cap thickness, and presence of a lipid-rich necrotic core (LNRC). Carotid ultrasound is the preferred initial diagnostic test to evaluate carotid artery stenosis, and can also be used to monitor response to lipid-lowering therapy.

=== Alternative imaging modalities ===
Digital subtraction angiography (DSA), magnetic resonance angiography (MRA), and CT angiography (CTA) are confirmatory imaging techniques typically employed after ultrasound and prior to therapeutic intervention. DSA is the gold standard for evaluating CAS, and MRI is the gold standard for carotid plaque imaging.

== Imaging Techniques ==
=== Duplex ultrasound ===
Duplex ultrasound (duplex) combines standard B-mode ultrasound and Doppler ultrasonography to evaluate both structural details of the carotid arteries and blood flow through the arteries. During carotid duplex evaluation, the 2D B-mode structural image is superimposed with the doppler flow data, which provides a more realistic anatomical assessment.

B-mode ultrasound is able to assess the structure of the carotid arteries and can identify areas of stenosis. B-mode is used identify stenotic lesions and to assess the echogenicity of plaques—strong correlation has been established between sonographic and histopathologic features of plaques. Plaque echolucency can signal an at-risk plaque, as it is the sonographic equivalent of a LNRC. Besides, other features such as intima-media thickness, surface of the plaque and presence of ulceration are also useful in predicting the possibility of stroke or heart attack in the future. Scanning through the eye can help to visualise carotid siphon (bend of internal carotid artery within the cavernous sinus) and ophthalmic artery.

Doppler ultrasound allows for assessment of carotid arterial blood flow. Blood flow velocity is increased in areas of stenosis compared to normal. Therefore, doppler imaging substantially aids in the diagnosis of carotid artery stenosis by ultrasound. Internal carotid artery (ICA) is located posterolateral, and larger when compared to the external carotid artery (ECA). ICA has low resistive pattern (difference between the blood velocities during heart systole and diastole) when compared to ECA. ICA has sudden increase in velocity of blood flow during systole and persistent forward blood flow during diastole. ICA peak systolic velocity more than 125m/sec and diastolic velocity more than 40 m/sec signifies stenosis.

ECA can be differentiated from the ICA by tapping superficial temporal artery of the same side. This will generate a saw-like appearance on ECA doppler. Temporary reversal of the direction of flow during early diastole in ECA is normal. ECA has triphasic flow pattern (forward flow in systole, reverse flow in early diastole, and forward flow in end diastole).

Vertebral artery also has low resistive pattern similar to ICA.

=== Contrast-enhanced ultrasound ===
Contrast-enhanced ultrasound (CEUS) is valuable because the contrast does not diffuse into surrounding tissues, and therefore all signals are intravascular. CEUS is used to assess plaque neovascularization and ulceration. Plaque enhancement on ultrasound has been proven to correlate with neovascularization, inflammation, and inflammation, and these features are associated with symptomatic carotid plaques. Intravenous contrast is able to improve the performance of carotid ultrasound in diagnosing carotid artery stenosis. Contraindications to the ultrasound contrast include allergy, heart failure, acute coronary syndrome, endocarditis, ventricular arrhythmia, and unstable respiration.

== Limitations ==
While ultrasound is able to assess plaque morphology, it is limited in both specificity and sensitivity in assessing lipid-rich necrotic core, plaque hemorrhage, and ulceration when compared to the gold standard. When diagnosing carotid artery stenosis, carotid ultrasound has a lower sensitivity than MRA but is more sensitive than CTA. However, both CTA and MRA have a higher specificity.

A major limitation of carotid ultrasound is a high degree of inter-/intraobserver variability; however, computerized algorithms used for evaluation of the intima-media thickness (IMT), a measure of plaque morphology, have helped minimize the degree of variability. Carotid ultrasound is dependent on operator skill, and other noted areas of limitation are poor insonation angle, poor blood flow, and deep artery location. CEUS is prone to overinterpretation of vessel wall abnormalities, known as pseudoenhancement.

== See also ==
- Medical ultrasonography
