= Amaurosis =

Loss of vision

Amaurosis (Greek meaning darkening, dark, or obscure) is vision loss or weakness that occurs without an apparent lesion affecting the eye. It may result from either a medical condition or excess acceleration, as in flight. The term is the same as the Latin gutta serena, which means, in Latin, clear drop (or bright drop). Gutta serena is a condition of partial or complete blindness with a transparent, clear pupil. This term contrasts with suffusio nigra which means, in Latin, dark suffusion, indicating partial or complete blindness with a dark pupil, e.g., a cataract. John Milton, already totally blind for twelve years (some scholars think from retinal detachment; others have diagnosed glaucoma) by the time he published Paradise Lost, refers to these terms in Book 3, lines 25–26.

== Types ==
=== Leber's congenital amaurosis ===
Leber's congenital amaurosis (LCA) is the most severe and earliest of the inherited retinal dystrophies that cause congenital blindness. It has an incidence of 2-3 per 100,000 births and accounts for 10-18% of cases of congenital blindness among children in blind institutes and 5% of all retinal dystrophies, a figure that is likely to be greater in countries with a greater percentage of consanguinity.

In most cases, LCA is inherited in an autosomal recessive pattern, as established by Alström and Olson in 1957. Some patients only have retinal blindness, whereas others have multi-systemic involvement that includes renal, cardiac, skeletal, and, most notably, central nervous system anomalies.

Theodor von Leber, a German ophthalmologist, described LCA in 1869 as a disorder characterized by profound visual loss present at or shortly after birth, nystagmus, sluggish pupillary reactions, and pigmentary retinopathy.

=== Amaurosis fugax ===
Amaurosis fugax, also known as transient monocular blindness, is caused by a sudden, temporary decrease in blood flow to one eye. The loss of vision is abrupt, lasting only seconds or minutes. Blindness is total, though it is sometimes limited to a specific area of vision. Blindness frequently develops as if a shade was drawn upward or downward over the eye, rarely sideward. Single or multiple attacks are possible. Some patients experience hundreds, if not thousands, of episodes. Pain, scintillations, and diplopia are usually not present. The prognosis for retinal recovery is good in most patients; retinal infarction occurs in a few.

=== Quinidine toxicity ===
Although amaurosis caused by quinine poisoning is now uncommon, it does occur on occasion. When quinine is used as an abortifacient, the initial history may be deceptive, but the presence of characteristic changes in the fundi usually allows certainty of a diagnosis.
