= Carotid artery stenosis =

Narrowing of the carotid arteries

- Other names: TIA - carotid artery
- Carotid artery disease
- Specialty: Vascular surgery

Carotid artery stenosis is a narrowing or constriction of any part of the carotid arteries, usually caused by atherosclerosis.

== Signs and symptoms ==
The common carotid artery is the large artery whose pulse can be felt on both sides of the neck under the jaw. On the right side it starts from the brachiocephalic artery (a branch of the aorta), and on the left side the artery comes directly off the aortic arch. At the throat it forks into the internal carotid artery and the external carotid artery. The internal carotid artery supplies the brain, and the external carotid artery supplies the face. This fork is a common site for atherosclerosis, an inflammatory build-up of atheromatous plaque inside the common carotid artery, or the internal carotid arteries that causes them to narrow.

The plaque can be stable and asymptomatic, or it can be a source of embolization. Emboli break off from the plaque and travel through the circulation to blood vessels in the brain. As the vessels get smaller, an embolus can lodge in the vessel wall and restrict the blood flow to parts of the brain. This ischemia can either be temporary, yielding a transient ischemic attack (TIA), or permanent resulting in a thromboembolic stroke.

Transient ischemic attacks are a warning sign and may be followed by severe permanent strokes, particularly within the first two days. TIAs by definition last less than 24 hours and frequently take the form of weakness or loss of sensation of a limb or the trunk on one side of the body or the loss of sight (amaurosis fugax) in one eye. Less common symptoms are artery sounds (bruits), or ringing in the ears (tinnitus).

In asymptomatic individuals with a carotid stenosis, the risk of developing a stroke is increased above those without a stenosis. The risk of stroke is possibly related to the degree of stenosis on imaging. Some studies have found an increased risk with increasing degrees of stenosis while other studies have not been able to find such a relationship.

== Pathophysiology ==
Atherosclerosis causes plaque to form within the carotid artery walls, usually at the fork where the common carotid artery divides into the internal and external carotid artery. The plaque build-up can narrow or constrict the artery lumen, a condition called stenosis. Rupture of the plaque can release atherosclerotic debris or blood clots into the artery. A piece of this material can break off and travel (embolize) up through the internal carotid artery into the brain, where it blocks circulation, and can cause death of the brain tissue, a condition referred to as ischemic stroke.

Sometimes the stenosis causes temporary symptoms first, known as TIAs, where temporary ischemia occurs in the brain, or retina without causing an infarction. Symptomatic stenosis has a high risk of stroke within the next 2 days. National Institute for Health and Clinical Excellence (NICE) guidelines recommend that people with moderate to severe (50–99% blockage) stenosis, and symptoms, should have "urgent" endarterectomy within 2 weeks.

When the plaque does not cause symptoms, people are still at higher risk of stroke than the general population, but not as high as people with symptomatic stenosis. The incidence of stroke, including fatal stroke, is 1–2% per year. The surgical mortality of endarterectomy ranges from 1–2% to as much as 10%. Two large randomized clinical trials have demonstrated that carotid surgery done with a 30-day stroke and death risk of 3% or less will benefit asymptomatic people with ≥60% stenosis who are expected to live at least 5 years after surgery. Surgeons are divided over whether asymptomatic people should be treated with medication alone or should have surgery.

The common carotid artery is the large vertical artery in red. The blood supply to the carotid artery starts at the arch of the aorta (bottom). The carotid artery divides into the internal carotid artery and the external carotid artery. The internal carotid artery supplies the brain. Plaque often builds up at that division and causes a narrowing (stenosis). Pieces of plaque can break off and block the small arteries above in the brain, which causes a stroke. Plaque can also build up at the origin of the carotid artery at the aorta.

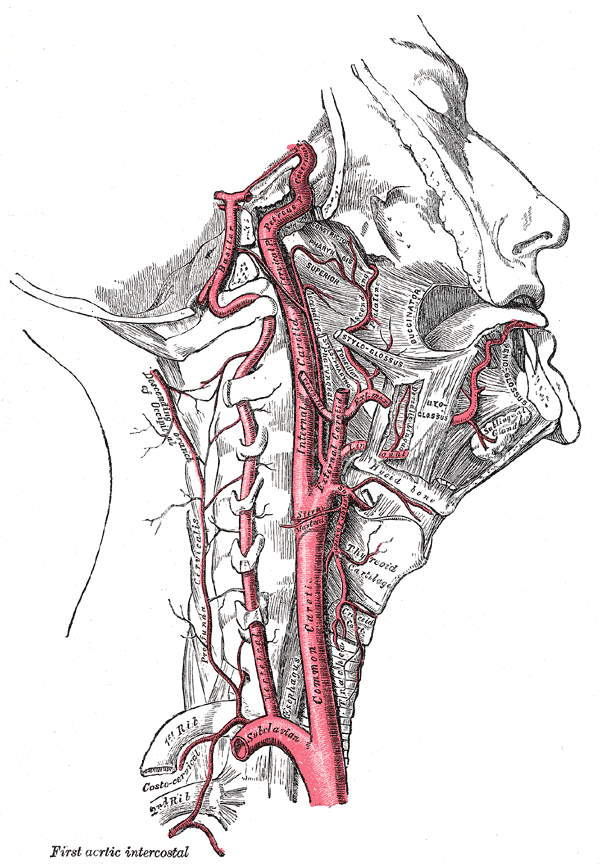
Carotid arteries

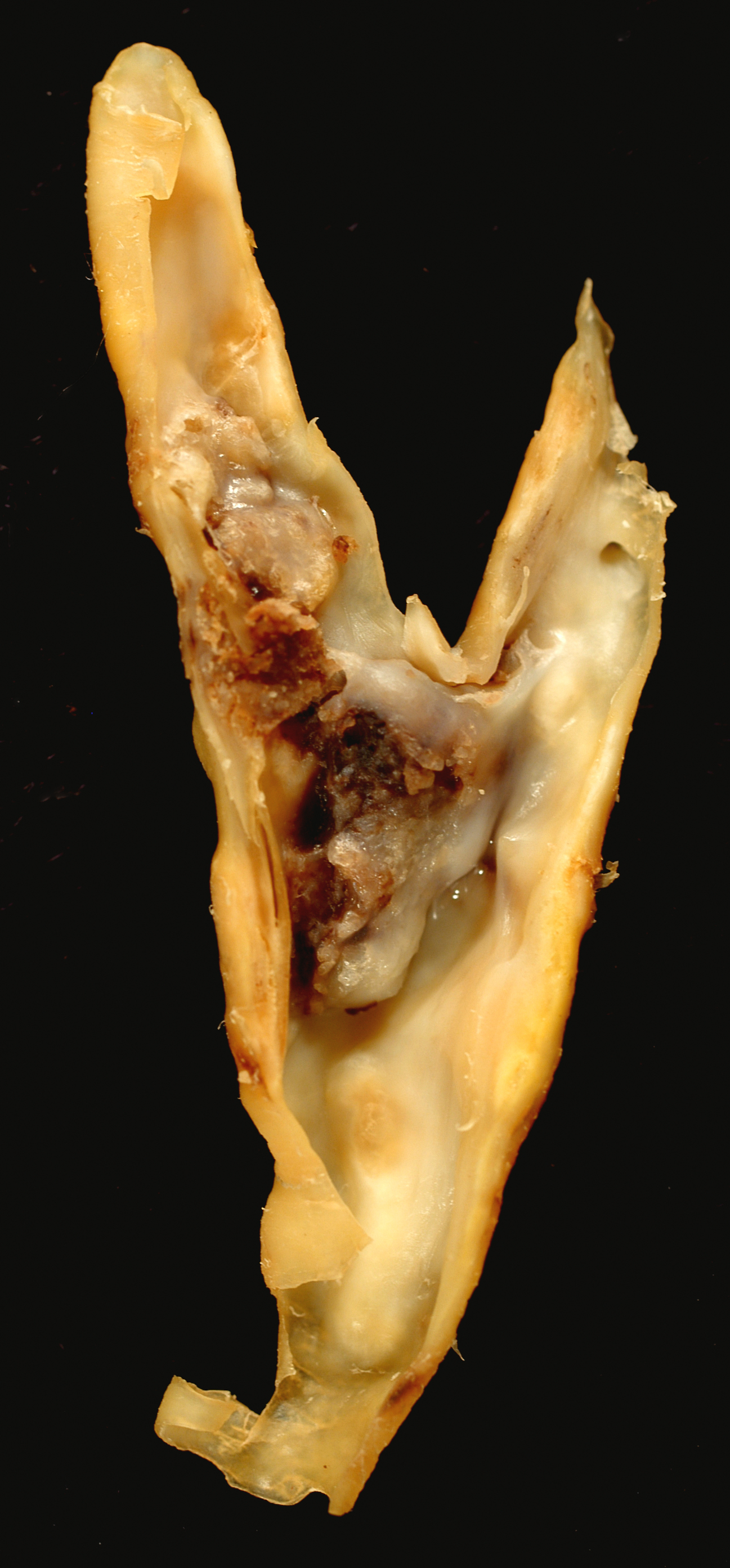
Section of carotid artery with plaque. Blood flows from the common carotid artery(bottom), and divides into the internal carotid artery (left) and external carotid artery (right). The atherosclerotic plaque is the dark mass on the left

== Diagnosis ==
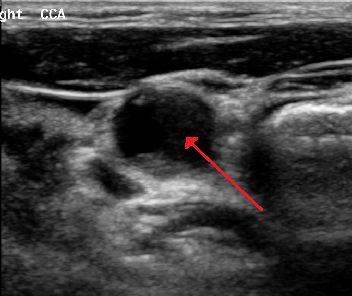
70 percent stenosis of the right internal carotid artery as seen by ultrasound. Arrow marks the lumen of the artery.

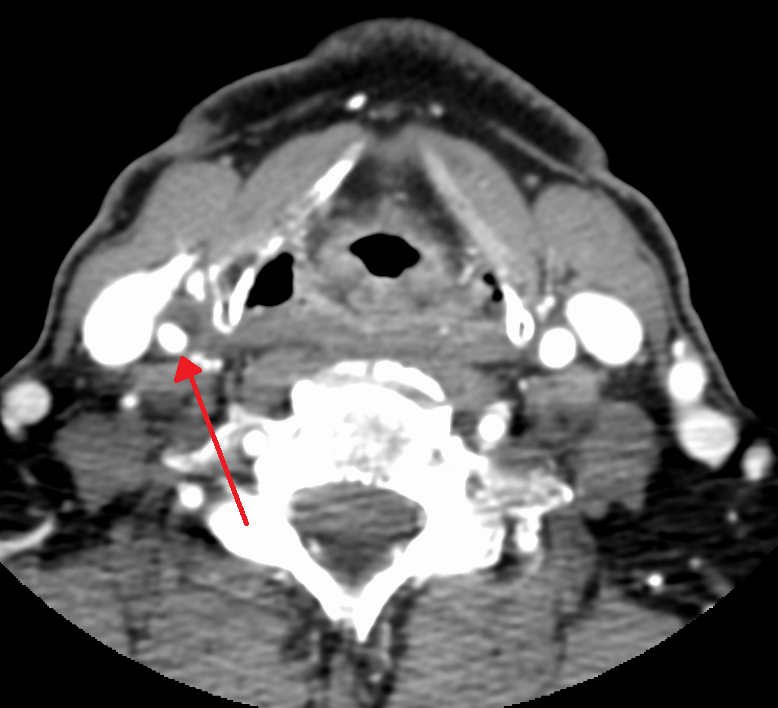
CT image of a 70 percent stenosis of the right internal carotid artery

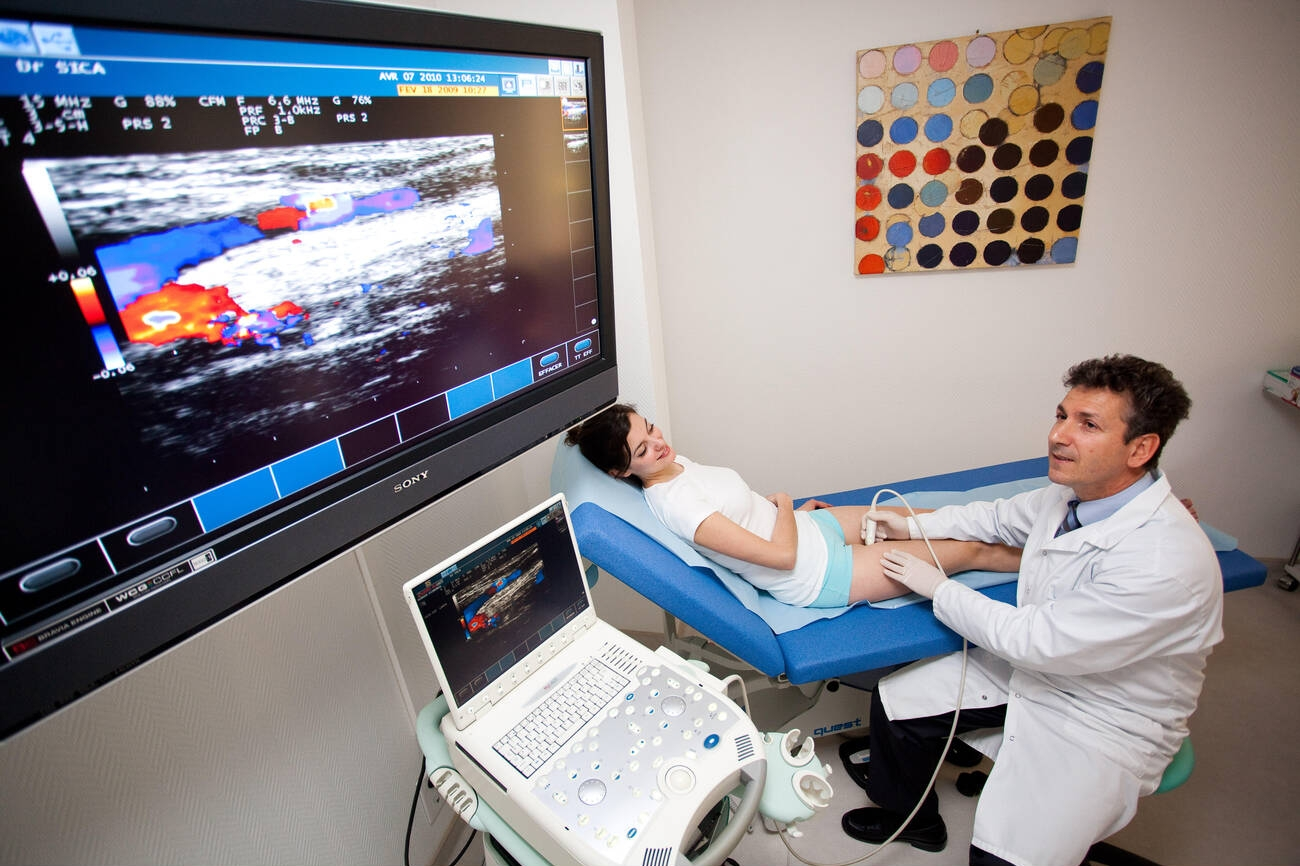
A vascular sonography examination using Doppler ultrasound to screen for carotid artery stenosis and evaluate blood flow velocities.

Carotid artery stenosis is usually diagnosed by color flow duplex ultrasound scan of the carotid arteries in the neck. This involves no radiation, no needles and no contrast agents that may cause allergic reactions. This test has good sensitivity and specificity.

Typically duplex ultrasound scan is the only investigation required for decision making in carotid stenosis as it is widely available and rapidly performed. However, further imaging can be required if the stenosis is not near the bifurcation of the carotid artery.

One of several different imaging modalities, such as a computed tomography angiogram (CTA) or magnetic resonance angiogram (MRA) may be useful. Each imaging modality has its advantages and disadvantages - Magnetic resonance angiography and CT angiography with contrast is contraindicated in patients with chronic kidney disease, catheter angiography has a 0.5% to 1.0% risk of stroke, MI, arterial injury or retroperitoneal bleeding. The investigation chosen will depend on the clinical question and the imaging expertise, experience and equipment available.

Based on the NASCET (The North American Symptomatic Carotid Endarterectomy Trial) criteria, the degree of carotid stenosis is defined as:

percent stenosis = ( 1 − ( minimum diameter within stenosis) / ( poststenotic diameter ) ) × 100%.

Calculators have been developed to facilitate grading of carotid stenosis per NASCET criteria.

=== Screening ===
The U.S. Preventive Services Task Force recommends against routine screening for carotid artery stenosis in those without symptoms as of 2021.

While routine population screening is not advised, the American Heart Association and the Society for Vascular Surgery recommend screening in those diagnosed with related medical conditions or have risk factors for carotid artery disease. Screening is recommended for people who have:

- Vascular disease elsewhere in the body, including:
  - Peripheral artery disease (PAD)
  - Coronary artery disease (CAD)
  - Atherosclerotic aortic aneurysm (AAA)
- Two or more of the following risk factors:
  - High blood pressure (hypertension)
  - High cholesterol (hyperlipidemia)
  - Tobacco smoking
  - Family history – First-degree relative diagnosed with atherosclerosis before age 60 or who had an ischemic stroke

The American Heart Association also recommends screening if a physician detects a carotid bruit, or murmur, over the carotid artery by listening through a stethoscope during a physical exam. For people with symptoms, the American Heart Association recommends initial screening using ultrasound.

== Treatment ==
The goal of treating carotid artery stenosis is to reduce the risk of stroke. The type of treatment depends on the severity of the disease and includes:

- Lifestyle modifications including smoking cessation, eating a healthy diet and reducing sodium intake, losing weight, and exercising regularly.
- Medications to control high blood pressure and high levels of lipids in the blood.
- Surgical intervention for carotid artery revascularization.

=== Medication ===
Clinical guidelines (such as those of the American Heart Association (AHA) and National Institute for Clinical Excellence (NICE)) recommend that all patients with carotid stenosis be given medications to control their vascular risk factors, usually blood pressure lowering medications (if they have hypertension), diabetes medication (if they have diabetes), and recommend exercise, weight reduction (if overweight) and smoking cessation (for smokers). In addition, they would benefit from anti-platelet medications (such as aspirin or clopidogrel) and cholesterol lowering medication (such as statins, which were originally prescribed for their cholesterol-lowering effects but were also found to reduce inflammation and stabilize plaque).

=== Revascularization ===
According to the American Heart Association, interventions beyond medical management is based upon whether patients have symptoms:

- Asymptomatic patients: severity of carotid artery stenosis, assessment of other medical conditions, life expectancy, and other individual factors; evaluation of the risks versus benefits; and patient preference are considered when determining whether surgical intervention should be performed.
- Symptomatic patients: it is recommended by the American Heart Association and the American Stroke Association that patients who have experienced a transient ischemic attack or non-severely disabling acute ischemic stroke undergo surgical intervention, if possible.

All interventions for carotid revascularization (carotid endarterectomy, carotid stenting, and transcarotid artery revascularization) carry some risk of stroke; however, where the risk of stroke over time from medical management alone is high, intervention may be beneficial. Carotid artery stenting and carotid endarterectomy have been found to have similar benefits in patients with severe degree of carotid artery stenosis.

== See also ==
- Ocular ischemic syndrome
