= Stenosis =

- Other names: Stenoses
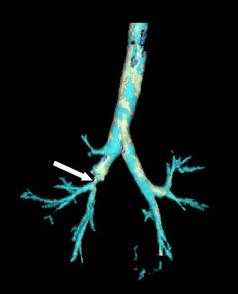
- CT scan of a bronchial stenosis (arrow) that resulted from tracheobronchial injury
- Pronunciation: /stəˈnoʊsɪs/

Stenosis (from Ancient Greek στενός (stenós) 'narrow') is the abnormal narrowing of a blood vessel or other tubular organ or structure such as foramina and canals. It is also sometimes called a stricture (as in urethral stricture).

Stricture as a term is usually used when narrowing is caused by contraction of smooth muscle (e.g. achalasia, Prinzmetal angina); stenosis is usually used when narrowing is caused by lesion that reduces the space of lumen (e.g. atherosclerosis). The term coarctation is another synonym, but is commonly used only in the context of aortic coarctation.

Restenosis is the recurrence of stenosis after a procedure.

== Examples ==
Examples of vascular stenotic lesions include:

- Intermittent claudication (peripheral artery stenosis)
- Angina (coronary artery stenosis)
- Carotid artery stenosis which predispose to (strokes and transient ischemic episodes)
- Renal artery stenosis

== Types ==
=== Vascular Stenosis ===
Arterial stenosis

- Carotid artery stenosis
- Coronary artery stenosis
- Renal artery stenosis
- Peripheral artery stenosis
- Vertebral artery stenosis
- Cerebral artery stenosis
- Pulmonary artery stenosis
  - Congenital or acquired abnormal narrowing of pulmonary arteries along any portion of the pulmonary artery tree

Venous stenosis

- Jugular venous stenosis
- Central venous stenosis

=== Cardiac Valve Stenosis ===
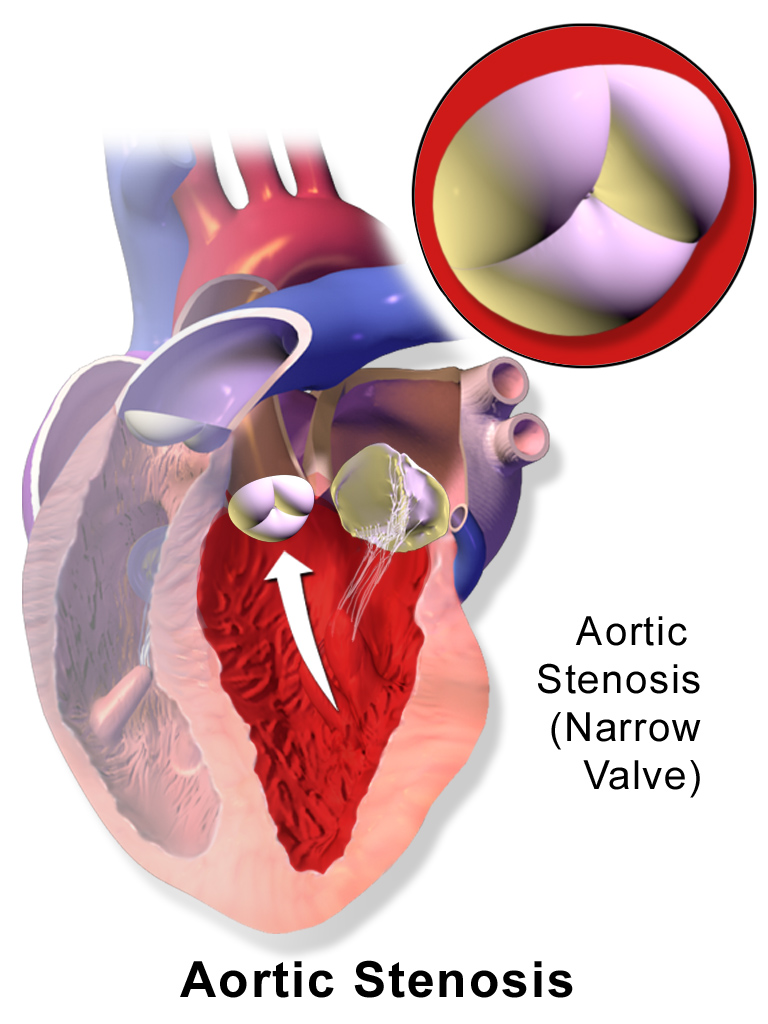
Animated representation of aortic stenosis

In order from most to least common:

- Aortic valve stenosis
  - Normal aortic valves are estimated to be less than a millimeter thick. Subsequent fibrosis and calcification of the valve leads to narrowing of the valve and therefore decreased blood flow out of the heart.
- Mitral valve stenosis
  - thickening of the mitral valve (of the left heart), therefore causing narrowing
- Tricuspid valve stenosis
  - thickening of the tricuspid valve (of the right heart), therefore causing narrowing
- Pulmonary valve stenosis
  - thickening of the pulmonary valve, therefore causing narrowing

Animated representation of spinal stenosis

=== Neurologic/Spine Stenosis ===
- Spinal canal stenosis
  - Cervical spinal stenosis
  - Thoracic stenosis
  - Lumbar stenosis
- Foraminal stenosis
- Aqueductal stenosis

Animated representation of pyloric stenosis

=== Gastrointestinal Stenosis ===
- Esophageal stenosis
  - A congenital or acquired fixed narrowing of the esophagus.
    - Congenital subtypes
      - Tracheobronchial remnants
      - Fibromuscular thickening / fibromuscular stenosis
      - Membranous webbing or esophageal membrane
    - Acquired
      - Injury (example: swallowing button battery)
      - Gastroesophageal reflux disease (GERD)
      - Eosinophilic esophagitis (EoE)
      - Achalasia
- Pyloric stenosis (infantile hypertrophic pyloric stenosis)
  - Relatively uncommon disorder of infants, usually between the ages of 2–12 weeks, caused by abnormal thickening of the pylorus muscle in the stomach at the junction between the end of the stomach and the beginning of the duodenum.
- Small-bowel stenosis
- Colonic stenosis (bowel obstruction)
- Anal stricture
- Rectal stricture

=== Respiratory Stenosis ===
- Subglottic stenosis
  - Congenital or acquired narrowing of airway diameter in anatomic area below the vocal cords.
- Laryngotracheal stenosis
- Bronchial stenosis

=== Genitourinary Stenosis ===
- Ureteral stenosis
- Urethral stenosis
- Cervical canal stenosis
- Meatal stenosis
- Vaginal stenosis
  - Abnormal shortening or tightening of the vaginal canal.

=== Others ===
- Biliary duct stenosis
- Spinal stenosis

== Causes ==
- Alcohol use
- Birth defects
- Calcification
- Diabetes
- Headbanging
- Iatrogenic
- Infection
- Inflammation
- Ischemia
- Neoplasm
- Smoking

== Diagnosis ==
Stenoses of the vascular type are often associated with unusual blood sounds resulting from turbulent flow over the narrowed blood vessel. This sound can be made audible by a stethoscope, but diagnosis is generally made or confirmed with some form of medical imaging (such as ultrasound).

== See also ==
- Atresia
