= Carotid artery =

Carotid artery may refer to:

- Common carotid artery, often "carotids" or "carotid", an artery on each side of the neck which divides into the external carotid artery and internal carotid artery
- External carotid artery, an artery on each side of the head and neck supplying blood to the face, scalp, skull, neck and meninges
- Internal carotid artery, an artery on each side of the head and neck supplying blood to the brain
