= Rowland Payne syndrome =

- Other names: RPS
- Specialty: Neurology, oncology
- Symptoms: Horner's syndrome, vocal cord paralysis, hemidiaphragm paralysis, ipsilateral shoulder pain
- Causes: Compressive or infiltrative lesion at the sixth cervical vertebra or thoracic inlet; most commonly metastatic carcinoma
- Risk factors: History of breast or lung cancer
- Diagnostic method: Clinical examination, pharmacological pupil testing, flexible laryngoscopy, chest imaging, CT or MRI
- Differential diagnosis: Pancoast tumour, Horner's syndrome (isolated), amyotrophic lateral sclerosis, Dejerine–Klumpke paralysis
- Treatment: Treatment of underlying cause; symptomatic management
- Prognosis: Depends on underlying aetiology; grave prognosis when associated with malignancy
- Frequency: Rare

Rowland Payne syndrome (RPS) is a rare neurological syndrome characterised by the simultaneous ipsilateral occurrence of Horner's syndrome, vocal cord paralysis, and hemidiaphragm paralysis, resulting from disruption of the cervical sympathetic chain, the recurrent laryngeal nerve (or its parent vagus nerve), and the phrenic nerve. It is named after Dr C M E Rowland Payne, a British dermatologist working at St Thomas' Hospital, London, who first described the condition in 1981 in three patients with metastatic breast cancer seen at the Royal Marsden Hospital. The eponym has been adopted in later case reports in neurology and paediatric journals.

The syndrome is typically associated with serious underlying pathology, most commonly malignant neoplasms of the breast or lung. Although the complete triad is the classic presentation, an incomplete triad does not exclude the diagnosis.

== Signs and symptoms ==
The three cardinal signs of Rowland Payne syndrome, which occur on the same side of the body, are:

- Horner's syndrome: caused by disruption of the cervical sympathetic chain, producing ipsilateral ptosis (drooping of the upper eyelid), miosis (constriction of the pupil), and anhidrosis (absence of sweating on the affected side of the face). Enophthalmos (apparent recession of the eyeball) may also be present.
- Vocal cord paralysis: caused by involvement of the recurrent laryngeal nerve or the vagus nerve, resulting in hoarseness, a weak voice, or dysphagia (difficulty swallowing).
- Hemidiaphragm paralysis: caused by dysfunction of the phrenic nerve, which may be clinically silent when unilateral in patients with adequate pulmonary reserve, or may manifest as dyspnoea and reduced breath sounds. It is identifiable on plain chest radiograph as a raised hemidiaphragm, and can be confirmed by diaphragmatic fluoroscopy or electromyography.

Additional features commonly reported in the literature include ipsilateral shoulder pain and weakness, which may reflect involvement of adjacent cervical sensory nerve roots, as well as brachial plexopathy presenting as weakness or sensory deficits in the upper limb.

== Causes ==
Rowland Payne syndrome arises from a lesion that compresses or infiltrates all three of the relevant nerve structures at a single point.

=== Malignant causes ===
Breast cancer is the most frequently identified cause, accounting for six of the ten published cases summarised in a 2025 case report. Lung cancer, including epidermoid carcinoma, has also been implicated. Other reported neoplastic causes include anaplastic thyroid carcinoma and neuroblastoma, including a reported case in a five-month-old infant with a cervico-mediastinal tumour.

=== Non-malignant causes ===
A small number of cases without an underlying malignancy have been described. These include cases attributed to birth trauma, in which shearing forces at the lower neck during delivery are proposed to stretch or injure the relevant motor nerves or their branches. A partial presentation, with diaphragmatic palsy and Horner's syndrome but without vocal cord involvement, has been reported in a three-month-old child with empyema thoracis. Transient Rowland Payne syndrome has been described as a complication of interscalene nerve block. In non-malignant cases, the prognosis is generally more favourable and spontaneous recovery may occur.

== Pathophysiology ==
The key anatomical feature is that three nerve structures converge at the level of the sixth cervical vertebra (C6). Here, the cervical sympathetic chain, the vagus nerve (including its branch, the recurrent laryngeal nerve), and the phrenic nerve pass in close proximity, posterior to the carotid sheath, anterolateral to the scalenus anterior muscle, and anteromedial to the internal jugular lymphatic chain. The fifth cervical nerve runs immediately behind them. Below C6, the nerves diverge. The scalenus anterior muscle shields the phrenic nerve from masses arising in the neck, which explains why phrenic palsy is not a consistent feature of Pancoast's syndrome. C6 is therefore the site at which a single lesion, most often infiltrated lymph nodes or a spreading tumour, can compromise all three structures at once.

The syndrome can also arise from lesions at the thoracic inlet, particularly larger masses that bridge the greater anatomical separation at that level. Cases related to trauma in the lower neck tend to affect the right side, reflecting the asymmetric course of the right recurrent laryngeal and phrenic nerves, both of which cross the right subclavian artery.

== Diagnosis ==
The diagnosis of Rowland Payne syndrome is clinical, supported by targeted investigations to confirm each component of the triad and to identify the underlying cause.

=== Confirming the triad ===
- Horner's syndrome may be confirmed pharmacologically. Topical cocaine drops fail to dilate the affected pupil, confirming a pre-ganglionic or post-ganglionic sympathetic lesion. Apraclonidine drops produce reversal of ptosis and miosis in the affected eye due to denervation hypersensitivity, and can be used as an alternative test.
- Vocal cord paralysis is confirmed by flexible laryngoscopy, which allows direct visualisation of impaired or absent movement of one vocal fold.
- Hemidiaphragm paralysis is identifiable on plain chest radiograph as a raised hemidiaphragm and is confirmed by fluoroscopic screening of diaphragmatic movement, or by electromyography in equivocal cases.

=== Imaging ===
Cross-sectional imaging of the neck and thoracic inlet is central to identifying the causative lesion. Contrast-enhanced computed tomography (CT) or magnetic resonance imaging (MRI) of the cervical spine and thoracic inlet can reveal lymphadenopathy, soft tissue masses, or direct tumour infiltration at the level of C6 or the thoracic inlet. Plain chest radiography may additionally show mediastinal widening, apical densities, pleural effusion, or an elevated hemidiaphragm.

Where malignancy is suspected, further investigation may include fine-needle aspiration or biopsy of a mass for histological diagnosis, PET scanning to assess for metastatic spread, and analysis of pleural fluid if effusion is present.

=== Differential diagnosis ===
Each component of the triad may occur independently in other conditions. Horner's syndrome alone may result from carotid artery dissection, cluster headache, or brainstem stroke. Vocal cord paralysis may follow thyroid surgery or viral infection. Phrenic nerve palsy may arise from trauma, spinal cord disease, or viral neuritis. It is the ipsilateral co-occurrence of all three features that is characteristic of Rowland Payne syndrome.

The syndrome may be mistaken for amyotrophic lateral sclerosis (ALS) or other motor neuron disease, particularly when symptoms are asymmetric and include limb weakness, dysphagia, and respiratory compromise. Key distinguishing features of Rowland Payne syndrome include the presence of sensory symptoms, focal electromyographic abnormalities limited to a cervical distribution, imaging evidence of a structural mass, and the absence of widespread upper and lower motor neuron signs. A 2025 case report described a patient with a remote history of breast cancer who was initially diagnosed with ALS; detailed imaging and cytological analysis of pleural fluid confirmed late metastatic recurrence as the cause of Rowland Payne syndrome, occurring more than 24 years after the original mastectomy.

The syndrome should also be distinguished from Pancoast's syndrome (which typically involves the brachial plexus, rib destruction, and Horner's syndrome but not routinely the phrenic nerve) and from the Dejerine–Klumpke syndrome (lower brachial plexus palsy with Horner's syndrome).

== Management ==
Treatment of Rowland Payne syndrome is directed at the underlying cause. In cases of malignancy, management may include surgical resection, systemic chemotherapy, or radiotherapy, according to tumour type and stage. Infectious causes are treated with appropriate antimicrobial therapy.

Symptomatic measures include respiratory support for significant hemidiaphragm paralysis, speech therapy for vocal cord palsy, and pain management for associated cervical or shoulder pain. In non-malignant cases, such as those arising from birth trauma or reversible nerve injury, spontaneous recovery may occur over months.

== Prognosis ==
Prognosis is determined primarily by the underlying aetiology. In patients with malignant disease, the appearance of Rowland Payne syndrome typically indicates locally advanced or metastatic disease, and in the original series all three patients died within seven months of the syndrome's recognition—a substantially shorter survival than the median of twelve to twenty months reported at the time for metastatic breast cancer. The interval between cancer diagnosis and onset of neurological symptoms has ranged from five months to twenty-four years across published cases, with a median of approximately fifty months, based on seven published cases.

In cases attributable to non-malignant causes, including birth trauma, the prognosis is considerably more favourable, and complete recovery has been reported.

== Epidemiology ==
Rowland Payne syndrome is rare, and only a small number of case reports and series have been published since its initial description in 1981.

== History ==
The syndrome was first described by C M E Rowland Payne, then working in the Skin Department at St Thomas' Hospital, London, and published in the Journal of the Royal Society of Medicine in November 1981. The original report documented three women with metastatic breast cancer, all seen during a three-month period in late 1979 at the Royal Marsden Hospital, Surrey. Rowland Payne noted that the triad of Horner's syndrome, hoarse voice, and paralysed hemidiaphragm had not previously been recorded, and observed that awareness of the syndrome would lead to its earlier identification.

The anatomical explanation proposed in the original paper—converging nerve pathways at the level of C6, vulnerable to a single infiltrative lesion within the internal jugular lymphatic chain—remains the accepted pathophysiological basis of the syndrome. Rowland Payne also speculated that the syndrome would be found in association with other diseases beyond breast cancer, including bronchial carcinoma and direct trauma, a prediction borne out by subsequent case reports.

== See also ==
- Horner's syndrome
- Pancoast tumour
- Vocal cord paralysis
- Phrenic nerve
