= Christopher Rowland Payne =

British dermatologist

- Known for: Rowland Payne syndrome
- Medical career
- Profession: Physician
- Field: Dermatology

Christopher M. E. Rowland Payne is a British dermatologist. He first described Rowland Payne syndrome in 1981, was the founding editor of the Journal of Cosmetic Dermatology, and in 2024 became the first president of the Royal Society of Medicine's Section of Aesthetic Medicine and Surgery.

== Career ==
Rowland Payne trained in London at St Bartholomew’s, St Thomas’s & Westminster Hospitals and in Edinburgh at the Royal Infirmary. Later, he was Professeur Universitaire at the Université de Paris-Créteil and Honorary Consultant Dermatologist to the Royal Marsden Hospital, London & Sutton. He is a consultant dermatologist at The London Clinic and has a private dermatology practice at 27 Devonshire Place, Westminster.

== Research ==
In 1981, while working at St Thomas' Hospital, Rowland Payne described three patients with metastatic breast cancer who had Horner's syndrome, vocal cord paralysis and phrenic nerve palsy on the same side, together with shoulder pain. Further cases were reported under his name, and the condition is now known as Rowland Payne syndrome.

In 1985, while at St Stephen's and Westminster Hospitals in London, he co-authored the first paper to describe the skin manifestations of AIDS and HIV. His other research includes a study of 46 patients with prurigo nodularis, published in the British Journal of Dermatology and recognised as a seminal review of the condition. He was also a co-author of a 1986 report of papuloerythroderma describing the "deck-chair sign", a sparing of the skin folds now regarded as typical of the condition, and of a 1987 study of 87 patients with toxic epidermal necrolysis treated at the Hôpital Henri Mondor in Créteil, France. A 1993 study he co-authored found that the age of onset of psoriasis falls into two groups, separated at around 40 years; it is cited in Rook's and won the British Association of Dermatologists' Wycombe Chair and Prize for 1993 and 1994.

== Aesthetic medicine ==
Rowland Payne was the founding editor of the Journal of Cosmetic Dermatology, which began publication in 2002, and later co-edited the international textbook Cosmetic Medicine and Surgery (2017) with Pierre André, Eckart Haneke and Leonardo Marini.

In 2024, the Royal Society of Medicine named him the first president of its new Section of Aesthetic Medicine and Surgery. In that role, he told The Daily Telegraph that some people seeking cosmetic procedures might be better helped by psychological treatment than by surgery, and gave oral evidence to the House of Commons Women and Equalities Committee's inquiry into breast implants and other cosmetic procedures. The committee's report, published in February 2026, cited his call for mental health checks before cosmetic treatment.

== Honours ==
In 2017 the Royal Society of Medicine awarded him the Stevens Medal and he delivered its Edwin Stevens Lecture, titled "Skin cancer and sun addiction".
