= Artery dissection =

Artery dissection may refer to:

- Aortic dissection
- Carotid artery dissection
- Coronary artery dissection
- Vertebral artery dissection
