= Pancoast =

Pancoast is a surname. Notable people with the surname include:

- Fred Pancoast (born c. 1932), human resources executive and former American football player and coach
- G. Sieber Pancoast (1914–1992), former Republican member of the Pennsylvania House of Representatives
- Henry Pancoast (1875–1939), American radiologist after whom a type of lung tumor is named (Pancoast tumor)
- Joseph Pancoast (1805–1882), American surgeon
- Judy Pancoast (born 1959), American singer, songwriter, and composer of children’s music

== See also ==
- Pancoast, Pennsylvania
- Pancoast Creek, tributary of the Lackawanna River in Pennsylvania, United States
- Pancoast Pelican, American twin-engine aircraft
- Pancoast tumor, also called a pulmonary sulcus tumor or superior sulcus tumor, tumor of the pulmonary apex
