= Cervical artery dissection =

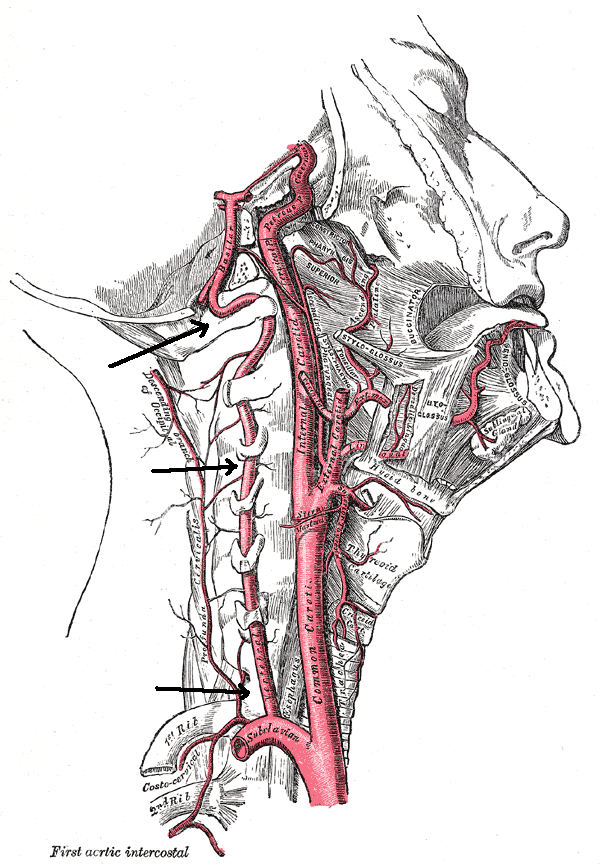
- Arteries of the neck
- Types: Carotid artery dissection, vertebral artery dissection

Cervical artery dissection is dissection of one of the layers that compose the carotid and vertebral artery in the neck (cervix). They include:

- Carotid artery dissection, a separation of the layers of the artery wall supplying oxygen-bearing blood to the head and brain.
- Vertebral artery dissection, a flap-like tear of the inner lining of the vertebral artery that supply blood to the brain and spinal cord.

Cervical dissections can be broadly classified as either "spontaneous" or traumatic. Cervical artery dissections are a significant cause of strokes in young adults.

A dissection typically results in a tear in one of the layers of the arterial wall. The result of this tear is often an intramural hematoma and/or aneurysmal dilation in the arteries leading to the intracranial area.

Signs and symptoms of a cervical artery dissection are often non-specific and can be localized or generalized. There is no specific treatment, although most patients are either given an anti-platelet or anti-coagulation agent to prevent or treat strokes.

== Epidemiology ==
Cervical artery dissection has been noted to be a common cause of young adult strokes, with some sources indicating a prevalence of up to 20% in this young adult population with annual incidence rates between 2.6 and 2.9 per 100,000, although these incidences may be misleading with true incidences being higher because clinical presentations can vary, many being minor or self-limited, and thus these dissections can go undiagnosed. In population-based studies, the peak age of presentation is approximately 45 years with a slight gender predisposition towards males (53–57%).

Cervical arteries, as mentioned above, consist of two pairs of arteries: vertebral and carotid. As such, cervical artery dissection can be further categorized based on the involvement of artery: carotid vs. vertebral, and the location of the dissection: intracranial vs. extracranial.

== Causes ==
The two main causes of cervical artery dissection can be broadly categorized as either spontaneous or traumatic. Arterial walls are composed of three layers: an intima (the innermost layer), media (the middle muscular layer), and adventitia (the outermost layer). A tear in one of the layers of the arterial walls can result in blood collecting within a pocket between the layers of the artery, which can result in an intramural hematoma and/or aneurysmal dilation. At the moment, there is no definitive location for the dissection, with some believing dissection initially occurs within the connective tissue and vasa vasorum of the media while others believe dissection begins with an intimal tear.

=== Spontaneous ===
Spontaneous cervical artery dissections are dissections that occur without any trauma to the neck. Risk factors that may predispose individuals to spontaneous cervical artery dissection include hereditary connective tissue diseases, family history of strokes, respiratory infections, smoking, hypertension, migraines, contraceptive use, pregnancy, and systemic lupus erythematosus. Hereditary connective tissue diseases include autosomal polycystic kidney disease, Ehlers–Danlos syndrome, Marfan syndrome, fibromuscular dysplasia, and osteogenesis imperfecta type 1 although studies have shown that the link between hereditary connective tissue diseases and cervical artery dissection is low, ranging from 0–0.6% in one study and 5–18% in another study.

=== Traumatic ===
Traumatic cervical artery dissections are dissections that occur after any sort of trauma to the neck, ranging from minor trauma such as nose-blowing or sneezing to severe trauma such as roadside accidents. Most traumatic dissections are secondary to some form of rapid decelerations injuries resulting in hyperextension or hyperflexion with rotational injury of the neck.

== Pathophysiology ==
Cervical artery dissections begin initially with a small tear in the innermost layer of the arterial wall, the tunica intima, or rupture of the vasa vasorum with bleeding within the media. As the arterial wall begins to tear, blood begins to enter this newly formed false lumen and the resulting hematoma formation can either narrow (stenosis) or occlude the artery, decreasing or completely blocking blood flow through the artery. A complete occlusion of the artery can result in cerebral ischemia as the brain is depleted of oxygen-rich blood. Because the brain has a pair of carotid and vertebral arteries on each side of the neck, a unilateral occlusion can be asymptomatic, as the bilateral circulation continues perfusing the brain. Thrombus formation is the natural physiologic response to the vascular injury to prevent significant blood loss. However, parts of the thrombus can break apart and result in emboli that can lodge themselves in distal cerebral arteries causing ischemic stroke, otherwise known as a cerebral infarction.

== Signs and symptoms ==
The signs and symptoms of cervical artery dissection are often non-specific or generalized and can either develop acutely or over several days.

- Headache
- Visual disturbances (i.e. diplopia, ptosis)
- Tinnitus
- Neck and face pain
- Horner syndrome (often partial)
- Loss of taste
- Anosmia
- Unilateral weakness
- Stroke

== Imaging ==
Various imaging modalities can be used for the diagnosis of cervical artery dissection. The diagnosis of cervical artery dissection can be confirmed with the presence of a mural hematoma on ultrasound (US) or magnetic resonance imaging (MRI) and will also guide therapeutic decision making. MRI, with a fat-suppressed T1 sequence, is often first-line imaging. However, other modalities exist with helical computed topographic angiography (CTA) becoming the new gold-standard. Magnetic resonance angiography (MRA) and doppler US can also be utilized as additional non-invasive imaging techniques. The purpose of these imaging techniques is often multi-functional. These imaging modalities can detect the direction and changes of blood flow within the arteries and whether the dissection has resulted in any damage to brain tissue.

== Treatment ==
The primary goal of treatment in cervical artery dissection is preventing or treating a stroke. Treatment guidelines also depend on the presence of underlying connective tissue disorders, dissection secondary to trauma, and underlying medical conditions. Management is often using either antiplatelet agents (i.e. aspirin) or anti-coagulation to prevent development of thrombus. Antiplatelet drugs can be given as individual drugs, or in combination (i.e. aspirin alone, or aspirin and clopidogrel). Anticoagulation such as heparin, intravenously (IV) or injectable (shot) can be given while inpatient and followed by heparin. A recent trial in 2015, the Cervical Artery Dissection in Stroke Study (CADISS), examined the efficacy of antiplatelet and anticoagulation treatment with the primary endpoint of ipsilateral stroke or death in individuals with symptomatic dissections. The CADISS trial revealed no significant difference in efficacy of antiplatelet and anticoagulant drugs in preventing strokes or death, but did note that strokes were rare in either group, and rarer than what has been reported in observational studies.
