= C. Miller Fisher =

Canadian doctor, neurologist, pathologist

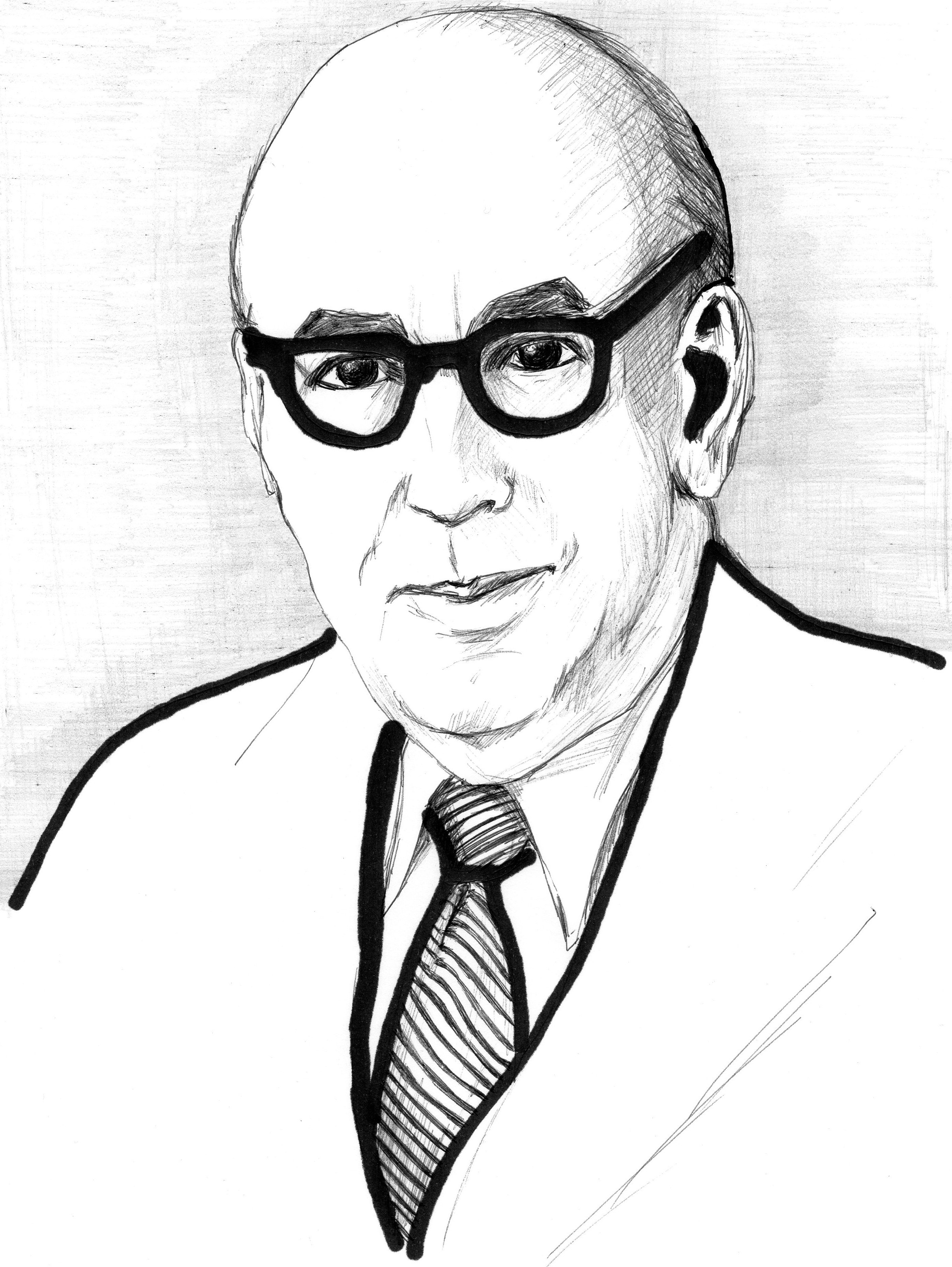

Charles Miller Fisher (December 5, 1913, Waterloo, Ontario – April 14, 2012, Albany, New York) was a Canadian neurologist whose notable contributions include the first detailed descriptions of lacunar strokes, the identification of transient ischemic attacks as stroke precursors, the identification of the link between carotid atherosclerosis and stroke, and the description of a variant form of Guillain–Barré syndrome which bears his name.

== Education and career ==
Fisher received a B.A. from Victoria University in Toronto in 1935. He then attended the University of Toronto Medical School, where he received his M.D. in 1938. He continued training at Henry Ford Hospital in Detroit and Royal Victoria Hospital in Montreal.

During World War II, Fisher served as a surgical lieutenant in the Royal Canadian Navy, and was aboard HMS Voltaire when it was sunk by German gunfire in 1941 off the coast of Cape Verde. Fisher was captured and spent 3.5 years in a German prison camp, until late 1944 when he was released.

Following his return to Canada, Fisher began his residency at McGill University at the Royal Victoria Hospital. In 1946 he worked as a Fellow at the Montreal Neurological Institute of McGill University. He then began working at Massachusetts General Hospital on the stroke service, beginning a long career in stroke neurology.

== Contributions ==
Fisher is credited with describing the clinical syndrome of the transient ischemic attack ("mini-stroke"). Fisher proved, by a series of pathological studies, the relationship between stroke and the formation of blood clots in the heart in patients with atrial fibrillation. He also showed the relationship between stroke and carotid artery stenosis, which made preventive surgery possible and greatly reduced the incidence of subsequent strokes. He was a founder of Massachusetts General Hospital Stroke Service. He contributed greatly towards the current use of anticoagulants for stroke prevention in atrial fibrillation.

He contributed greatly to the understanding of stroke, more specifically carotid artery disease and lacunar infarcts and their syndromes. With regard to the lacunar syndromes he described the concept, the "pure motor stroke", the "pure sensory stroke", and the mechanism underlying the different stroke syndromes.

He made a number of contributions to the understanding of Cervical artery dissection (carotid artery dissection and vertebral artery dissection) in the 1970s, and that of subarachnoid hemorrhage due to cerebral aneurysms.

In 1956, he reported a variant of Guillain–Barré syndrome, nowadays known as Miller Fisher Syndrome.

The "Fisher test" is also used to describe the CSF tap test which may be required in the diagnosis of normal pressure hydrocephalus.

== Personal life ==
C. Miller Fisher was married to Doris M. Fisher for 68 years until her death in 2008. He had two sons and one daughter.

== Awards and honors ==
In 1952 he was the recipient of the Royal College of Physicians of Canada's Prize in Medicine, and in 1998 he entered the Canadian Medical Hall of Fame.

== Death ==
Fisher died April 14, 2012, in St. Peter's Nursing & Rehabilitation Center in Albany, New York. He was 98 years old.
