= Vertebral artery dissection =

Tear of the inner lining of the vertebral artery

- Other names: Vertebral dissection
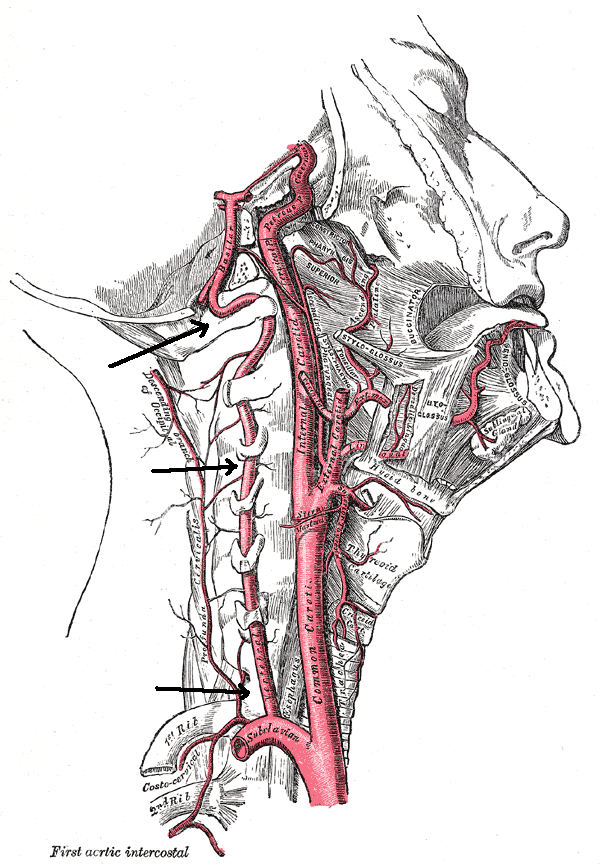
- Arteries of the neck, with arrows indicating the right vertebral artery
- Specialty: Neurology
- Symptoms: Headache, difficulty speaking, difficulty swallowing, poor coordination
- Complications: Stroke, subarachnoid hemorrhage
- Causes: Trauma, Ehlers–Danlos syndrome, Marfan syndrome
- Diagnostic method: Computed tomography angiography, magnetic resonance angiography, invasive angiography
- Treatment: Anticoagulation, angioplasty, surgery
- Medication: Aspirin, heparin, warfarin
- Frequency: 1.1 per 100,000

Vertebral artery dissection (VAD) is a flap-like tear of the inner lining of the vertebral artery, which is located in the neck and supplies blood to the brain. After the tear, blood enters the arterial wall and forms a blood clot, thickening the artery wall and often impeding blood flow. The symptoms of vertebral artery dissection include head and neck pain and intermittent or permanent stroke symptoms such as difficulty speaking, impaired coordination, and visual loss. It is usually diagnosed with a contrast-enhanced CT or MRI scan.

Vertebral dissection may occur after physical trauma to the neck, such as a blunt injury (e.g. traffic collision) or strangulation, or after sudden neck movements (e.g. coughing), but may also happen spontaneously. 1–4% of spontaneous cases have a clear underlying connective tissue disorder affecting the blood vessels. Treatment is usually with either antiplatelet drugs such as aspirin or with anticoagulants such as heparin or warfarin.

Vertebral artery dissection is less common than carotid artery dissection (dissection of the large arteries in the front of the neck). The two conditions together account for 10–25% of non-hemorrhagic strokes in young and middle-aged people. Over 75% recover completely or with minimal impact on functioning, with the remainder having more severe disability and a very small proportion (about 2%) dying from complications. It was first described in the 1970s by the Canadian neurologist C. Miller Fisher.

== Classification ==
Vertebral artery dissection is one of the two types of cervical artery dissection. The other type, carotid artery dissection, involves the carotid arteries. Vertebral artery dissection is further classified as being either traumatic (caused by mechanical trauma to the neck) or spontaneous, and it may also be classified by the part of the artery involved: extracranial (the part outside the skull) and intracranial (the part inside the skull).

== Signs and symptoms ==
Head pain occurs in 50–75% of all cases of vertebral artery dissection. It tends to be located at the back of the head, either on the affected side or in the middle, and develops gradually. It is either dull or pressure-like in character or throbbing. About half of those with VAD consider the headache distinct, while the remainder have had a similar headache before. It is suspected that VAD with headache as the only symptom is fairly common; 8% of all cases of vertebral and carotid dissection are diagnosed on the basis of pain alone.

Obstruction of blood flow through the affected vessel may lead to dysfunction of part of the brain supplied by the artery. This happens in 77–96% of cases. This may be temporary ("transient ischemic attack") in 10–16% of cases, but many (67–85% of cases) end up with a permanent deficit or a stroke. The vertebral artery supplies the part of the brain that lies in the posterior fossa of the skull, and this type of stroke is therefore called a posterior circulation infarct. Problems may include difficulty speaking or swallowing (lateral medullary syndrome); this occurs in less than a fifth of cases and occurs due to dysfunction of the brainstem. Others may experience unsteadiness or lack of coordination due to involvement of the cerebellum, and still others may develop visual loss (on one side of the visual field) due to involvement of the visual cortex in the occipital lobe. In the event of involvement of the sympathetic tracts in the brainstem, a partial Horner's syndrome may develop; this is the combination of a drooping eyelid, constricted pupil, and an apparently sunken eye on one side of the face.

If the dissection of the artery extends to the part of the artery that lies inside the skull, subarachnoid hemorrhage may occur (1% of cases). This arises due to rupture of the artery and accumulation of blood in the subarachnoid space. It may be characterized by a different, usually severe headache; it may also cause a range of additional neurological symptoms.

13–16% of all people with vertebral or carotid dissection have dissection in another cervical artery. It is therefore possible for the symptoms to occur on both sides, or for symptoms of carotid artery dissection to occur at the same time as those of vertebral artery dissection. Some give a figure of multiple vessel dissection as high as 30%.

== Causes ==
The causes of vertebral artery dissection can be grouped under two main categories, spontaneous and traumatic.

=== Spontaneous ===
Spontaneous cases are considered to be caused by intrinsic factors that weaken the arterial wall. Only a very small proportion (1–4%) have a clear underlying connective tissue disorder, such as Ehlers–Danlos syndrome type 4 and, more rarely, Marfan syndrome. However, ultrastructural abnormalities of the dermal connective tissue components are discernible in two out of three patients with spontaneous dissection. Ehlers–Danlos syndrome type 4, caused by mutations of the COL3A gene, leads to defective production of the collagen, type III, alpha 1 protein and causes skin fragility as well as weakness of the walls of arteries and internal organs. Marfan syndrome results from mutations in the FBN1 gene, defective production of the protein fibrillin-1, and a number of physical abnormalities including aneurysm of the aortic root.

There have also been reports in other genetic conditions, such as osteogenesis imperfecta type 1, autosomal dominant polycystic kidney disease and pseudoxanthoma elasticum, α_{1} antitrypsin deficiency and hereditary hemochromatosis, but evidence for these associations is weaker. Genetic studies in other connective tissue-related genes have mostly yielded negative results. Other abnormalities to the blood vessels, such as fibromuscular dysplasia, have been reported in a proportion of cases. Atherosclerosis does not appear to increase the risk.

There have been numerous reports of associated risk factors for vertebral artery dissection; many of these reports suffer from methodological weaknesses, such as selection bias. Elevated homocysteine levels, often due to mutations in the MTHFR gene, appear to increase the risk of vertebral artery dissection. People with an aneurysm of the aortic root and people with a history of migraine may be predisposed to vertebral artery dissection. Vascular tortuosity or redundancy in young patients is associated with an increased risk of spontaneous dissection.

=== Traumatic ===
Traumatic vertebral dissection may follow blunt trauma to the neck, such as in a traffic collision, direct blow to the neck, strangulation, or whiplash injury. 1–2% of those with major trauma may have an injury to the carotid or vertebral arteries. In many cases of vertebral dissection, people report recent very mild trauma to the neck or sudden neck movements, e.g. in the context of playing sports. Others report a recent infection, particularly respiratory tract infections associated with coughing. Trauma has been reported to have occurred within a month of dissection in 40% with nearly 90% of the traumas being minor. It has been difficult to prove the association of vertebral artery dissection with mild trauma and infections statistically. It is likely that many "spontaneous" cases may in fact have been caused by such relatively minor insults in someone predisposed by other structural problems to the vessels. A more likely theory, also as yet unproven, is that the low-energy traumatic dissections are actually spontaneous dissections brought to medical attention by the onset of neurological symptoms. These neurological events represent embolic phenomena due to loosening or breakdown of the clot at the site of the dissection, which can be triggered by low energy trauma or even occur spontaneously. The fragments travel within the arterial system downstream to the brain to cause stroke or stroke-like symptoms.

Vertebral artery dissection has also been reported in association with some forms of neck manipulation. There is significant controversy about the level of risk of stroke from neck manipulation. It may be that manipulation can cause dissection, or it may be that the dissection is already present in some people who seek manipulative treatment. At this time, conclusive evidence does not exist to support either a strong association between neck manipulation and stroke, or no association. However, the two most authoritative articles on the subject, recent literature reviews and analyses, conclude that although there exists an association between stroke from vertebral artery dissection and chiropractic adjustment, there is insufficient evidence to indicate that the adjustment caused the dissection. A recent meta-analysis of the published data on the topic also looked to apply Hill's criteria for assigning causation in biological systems to the relationship between chiropractic adjustment and cervical artery dissection, finding that the relationship did not fulfill the required criteria for causality.

== Mechanism ==
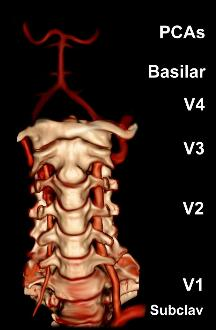
A reconstruction of the vertebral arteries from a CT scan, seen from the front. From the bottom, V1 is from the subclavian artery to the foramina, V2 is from the foramina to the second vertebra, V3 is between the foramina until entry into the skull, and V4 is inside the skull embedded in the dura mater. They merge into the basilar artery, which then divides into the posterior cerebral artery.

The vertebral arteries arise from the subclavian artery, and run through the transverse foramen of the upper six vertebrae of the neck. After exiting at the level of the first cervical vertebra, its course changes from vertical to horizontal, and then enters the skull through the foramen magnum. Inside the skull, the arteries merge to form the basilar artery, which joins the circle of Willis. In total, three quarters of the artery are outside the skull; it has a high mobility in this area due to rotational movement in the neck and is therefore vulnerable to trauma. Most dissections happen at the level of the first and second vertebrae. The vertebral artery supplies a number of vital structures in the posterior cranial fossa, such as the brainstem, the cerebellum and the occipital lobes. The brainstem harbors a number of vital functions (such as respiration) and controls the nerves of the face and neck. The cerebellum is part of the diffuse system that coordinates movement. Finally, the occipital lobes participate in the sense of vision.

Dissection occurs when blood accumulates in the wall of the blood vessel. This is most likely due to a tear in the tunica intima (the inner layer), allowing blood to enter the tunica media, although other lines of evidence have suggested that the blood may instead arise from the vasa vasorum, the small blood vessels that supply the outer layer of larger blood vessels. Various theories exist as to whether people who sustain carotid and vertebral artery dissection, even if they do not have a connective tissue disorder, have an underlying vulnerability. Biopsy samples of skin and other arteries has indicated that this might be a possibility, but no genetic defect in collagen or elastin genes has been convincingly proven. Other studies have indicated inflammation of the blood vessels, as measured by highly sensitive C-reactive protein (hsCRP, a marker of inflammation) in the blood.

Once dissection has occurred, two mechanisms contribute to the development of stroke symptoms. Firstly, the flow through the blood vessel may be disrupted due to the accumulation of blood under the vessel wall, leading to ischemia (insufficient blood supply). Secondly, irregularities in the vessel wall and turbulence increase the risk of thrombosis (the formation of blood clots) and embolism (migration) of these clots of the brain. From various lines of evidence, it appears that thrombosis and embolism is the predominant problem.

Subarachnoid hemorrhage due to arterial rupture typically occurs if the dissection extends into the V4 section of the artery. This may be explained by the fact that the arterial wall is thinner and lacks a number of structural supports in this section.

== Diagnosis ==
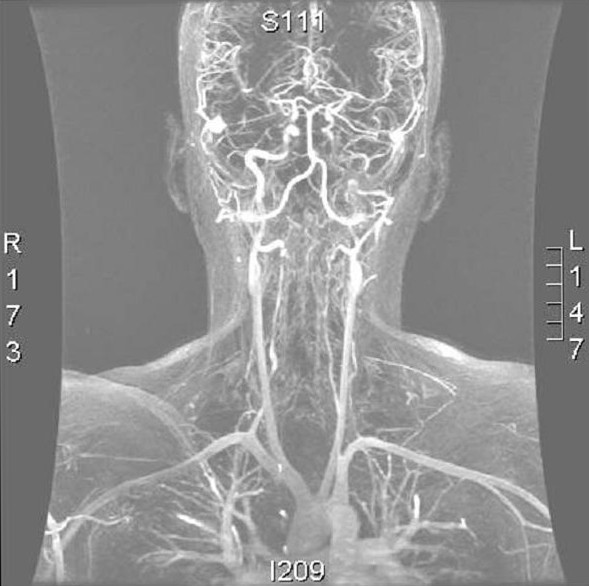
Magnetic resonance angiogram of the neck vessels in a person with Ehlers-Danlos syndrome type IV; it shows a dissection of the left internal carotid artery, dissection of both vertebral arteries in their V1 and V2 segments and a dissection of the middle and distal third of the right subclavian artery. Such striking episodes of dissection are typical for this "vascular" subtype of Ehlers-Danlos syndrome.

Various diagnostic modalities exist to demonstrate blood flow or absence thereof in the vertebral arteries. The gold standard is cerebral angiography (with or without digital subtraction angiography). This involves puncture of a large artery (usually the femoral artery) and advancing an intravascular catheter through the aorta towards the vertebral arteries. At that point, radiocontrast is injected and its downstream flow captured on fluoroscopy (continuous X-ray imaging). The vessel may appear stenotic (narrowed, 41–75%), occluded (blocked, 18–49%), or as an aneurysm (area of dilation, 5–13%). The narrowing may be described as "rat's tail" or "string sign". Cerebral angiography is an invasive procedure, and it requires large volumes of radiocontrast that can cause complications such as kidney damage. Angiography also does not directly demonstrate the blood in the vessel wall, as opposed to more modern modalities. The only remaining use of angiography is when endovascular treatment is contemplated (see below).

More modern methods involve computed tomography (CT angiography) and magnetic resonance imaging (MR angiography). They use smaller amounts of contrast and are not invasive. CT angiography and MR angiography are more or less equivalent when used to diagnose or exclude vertebral artery dissection. CTA has the advantage of showing certain abnormalities earlier, tends to be available outside office hours, and can be performed rapidly. When MR angiography is used, the best results are achieved in the T_{1} setting using a protocol known as "fat suppression". Doppler ultrasound is less useful as it provides little information about the part of the artery close to the skull base and in the vertebral foramina, and any abnormality detected on ultrasound would still require confirmation with CT or MRI.

== Treatment ==
Treatment is focused on reducing stroke episodes and damage from a distending artery. Four treatment modalities have been reported in the treatment of vertebral artery dissection. The two main treatments involve medication: anticoagulation (using heparin and warfarin) and antiplatelet drugs (usually aspirin). More rarely, thrombolysis (medication that dissolves blood clots) may be administered, and occasionally obstruction may be treated with angioplasty and stenting. No randomized controlled trials have been performed to compare the different treatment modalities. Surgery is only used in exceptional cases.

=== Anticoagulation and aspirin ===
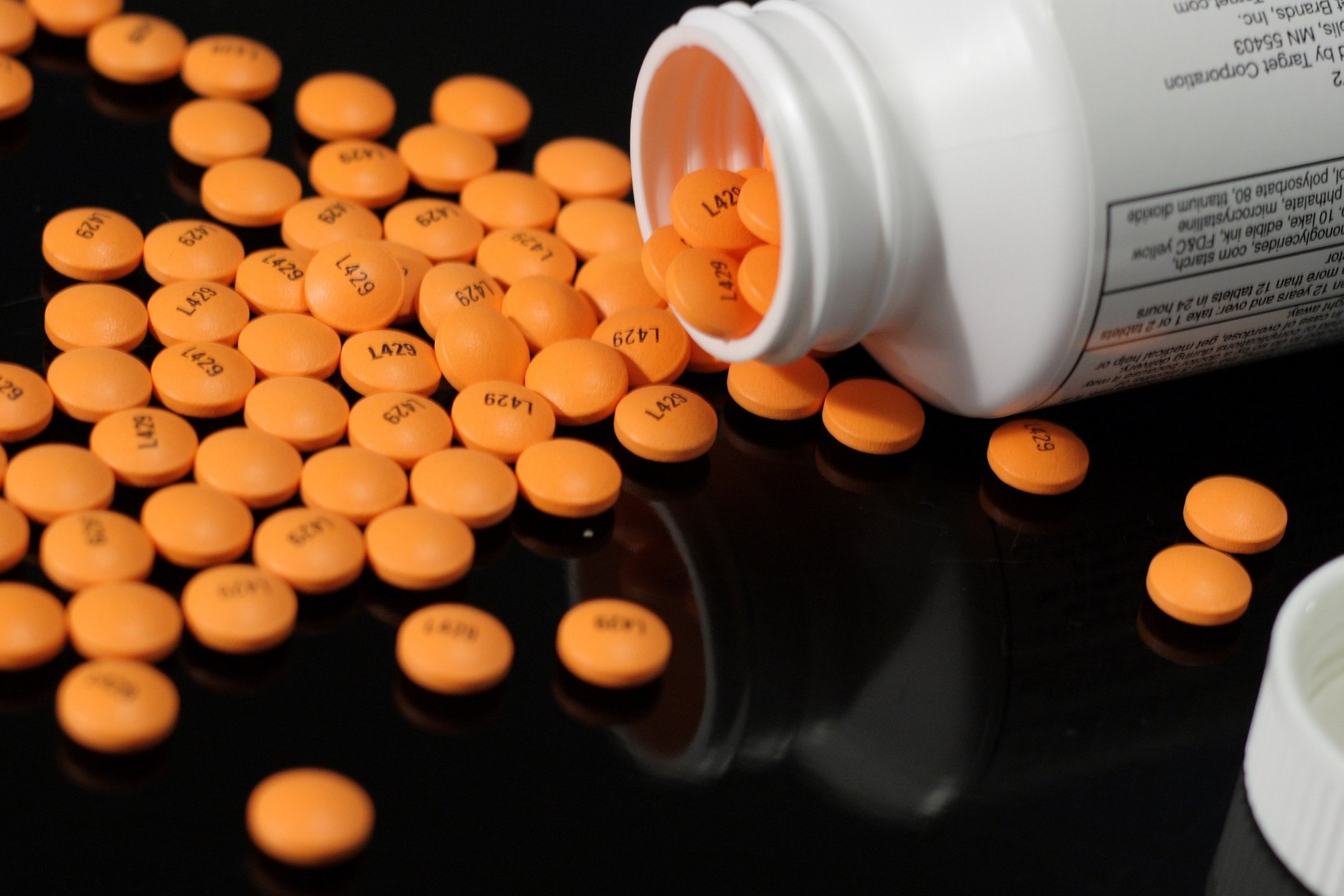
Aspirin (tablets pictured) is commonly used after stroke. In vertebral artery dissection it appears as effective as anticoagulation with warfarin.

From analysis of the existing small treatment trials of cervical artery dissection (carotid and vertebral) it appears that aspirin and anticoagulation (heparin followed by warfarin) are equally effective in reducing the risk of further stroke or death. Anticoagulation is regarded as more powerful than antiplatelet therapy, but anticoagulants may increase the size of the hematoma and worsen obstruction of the affected artery. Anticoagulation may be relatively unsafe if a large stroke has already occurred, as hemorrhagic transformation is relatively common, and if the dissection extends into V4 (carrying a risk of subarachnoid hemorrhage). Anticoagulation may be appropriate if there is rapid blood flow (through a severely narrowed vessel) on transcranial doppler despite the use of aspirin, if there is a completely occluded vessel, if there are recurrent stroke-like episodes, or if free-floating blood clot is visible on scans. Warfarin is typically continued for 3–6 months, as during this time the flow through the artery usually improves, and most strokes happen within the first 6 months after the development of the dissection. Some regard 3 months as sufficient.

Professional guidelines in the UK recommend that patients with VA dissection should be enrolled in a clinical trial comparing aspirin and anticoagulation if possible. American guidelines state that the benefit of anticoagulation is not currently established.

=== Thrombolysis, stenting and surgery ===
Thrombolysis, stenting and surgery are not used as widely as anticoagulation or antiplatelet drugs. These treatments are invasive, and are typically reserved for situations where symptoms worsen despite medical treatment, or where medical treatment may be unsafe (e.g. an unacceptable bleeding tendency).

Thrombolysis is enzymatic destruction of blood clots. This is achieved by the administration of a drug (such as urokinase or alteplase) that activates plasmin, an enzyme that occurs naturally in the body and digests clots when activated. Thrombolysis is an accepted treatment for heart attacks and stroke unrelated to dissection. In cervical artery dissection, only small case series are available. The thrombolytic drug is administered either intravenously or during cerebral angiography through a catheter directly into the affected artery. The data indicates that thrombolysis is safe, but its place in the treatment of VAD is uncertain.

Stenting involves the catheterization of the affected artery during angiography, and the insertion of a mesh-like tube; this is known as "endovascular therapy" (inside the blood vessel). This may be performed to allow the blood to flow through a severely narrowed vessel, or to seal off an aneurysm. However, it is unclear whether the technical success of the procedure translates into improved outcomes, as in both cases the problem often resolves spontaneously over time. Stenting, as well as the insertion of coils by means of angiography, may be performed if there is an aneurysm and/or extension of the dissection into the V4 section of the artery.

Surgery carries a high risk of complications, and is typically only offered in case of inexorable deterioration or contraindications to any of the other treatments. Various arterial repair procedures have been described.

== Prognosis ==
Prognosis of spontaneous cervical arterial dissection involves neurological and arterial results. The overall functional prognosis of individuals with stroke due to cervical artery dissection does not appear to vary from that of young people with stroke due to other causes. The rate of survival with good outcome (a modified Rankin score of 0–2) is generally about 75%, or possibly slightly better (85.7%) if antiplatelet drugs are used. In studies of anticoagulants and aspirin, the combined mortality with either treatment is 1.8–2.1%.

After the initial episode, 2% may experience a further episode within the first month. After this, there is a 1% annual risk of recurrence. Those with high blood pressure and dissections in multiple arteries may have a higher risk of recurrence. Further episodes of cervical artery dissection are more common in those who are younger, have a family history of cervical artery dissection, or have a diagnosis of Ehlers-Danlos syndrome or fibromuscular dysplasia.

== Epidemiology ==
The annual incidence is about 1.1 per 100,000 annually in population studies from the United States and France. From 1994 to 2003, the incidence increased threefold; this has been attributed to the more widespread use of modern imaging modalities rather than a true increase. Similarly, those living in urban areas are more likely to receive appropriate investigations, accounting for increased rates of diagnosis in those dwelling in cities. It is suspected that a proportion of cases in people with mild symptoms remains undiagnosed.

There is controversy as to whether VAD is more common in men or in women; an aggregate of all studies shows that it is slightly higher incidence in men (56% versus 44%). Men are on average 37–44 years old at diagnosis, and women 34–44. While dissection of the carotid and vertebral arteries accounts for only 2% of strokes (which are usually caused by high blood pressure and other risk factors, and tend to occur in the elderly), they cause 10–25% of strokes in young and middle-aged people.

Dissecting aneurysms of the vertebral artery constitute 4% of all cerebral aneurysms, and are hence a relatively rare but important cause of subarachnoid hemorrhage.

== History ==
Spontaneous vertebral artery dissection was described in the 1970s. Prior to this, there had been isolated case reports about carotid dissection. In 1971, C. Miller Fisher, a Canadian neurologist and stroke physician working at Massachusetts General Hospital, first noted the "string sign" abnormality in carotid arteries on cerebral angiograms of stroke patients, and subsequently discovered that the same abnormality could occur in the vertebral arteries. He reported the discovery in a paper in 1978.

== Notable cases ==
Australian cricketer Phillip Hughes died on 27 November 2014 after developing a vertebral artery dissection as a result of being struck on the side of the neck by a cricket ball, while representing South Australia in a Sheffield Shield match on 25 November 2014 at the Sydney Cricket Ground. The short-pitched delivery bowled by NSW player Sean Abbott struck Hughes on the base of the skull, just behind his left ear which caused a vertebral artery dissection complicated by subarachnoid hemorrhage.

== See also ==
- Aortic dissection
- Carotid artery dissection
