= Fisher test =

Fisher test may refer to:

- Fisher's exact test, a statistical significance test
- Miller Fisher test, a medical diagnostic procedure
