= Arterial dissections =

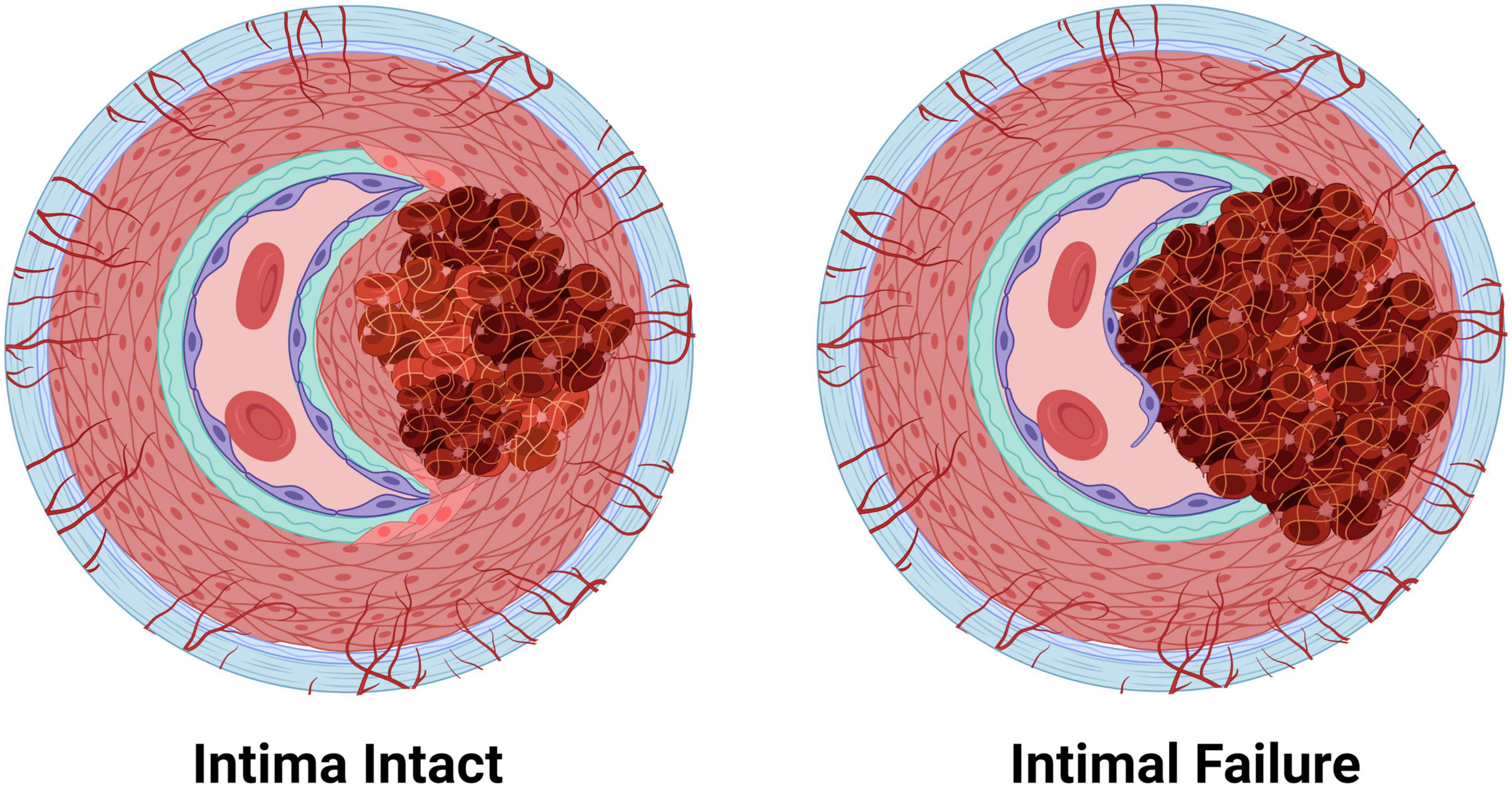
- Aortic dissection
- Specialty: Vascular surgery

An arterial dissection is a tear within the wall of an artery, which allows blood to separate the wall layers. There are several types. Tears almost always occur in arterial walls, but a vein wall tear has been documented.

By separating a portion of the wall of the artery (a layer of the tunica media or in some cases tunica intima), a tear creates two lumens or passages within the vessel, the original or true lumen, and the false lumen created by the new space within the wall of the artery. It is not yet clear if the tear in the innermost layer, the tunica intima, is secondary to the tear in the tunica media. Dissections originating in the tunica media are caused by disruption of the vasa vasorum. It is thought that dysfunction in the vasa vasorum is an underlying cause of dissections.

== Description ==
Arterial dissections become life-threatening when growth of the false lumen prevents perfusion of the true lumen and the related end organs. For example, in an aortic dissection, if the left subclavian artery orifice were distal to the origin of the dissection, then the left subclavian would be said to be perfused by the false lumen, while the left common carotid (and its end organ, the left hemisphere of the brain) if proximal to the dissection, would be perfused by the true lumen proximal to the dissection.

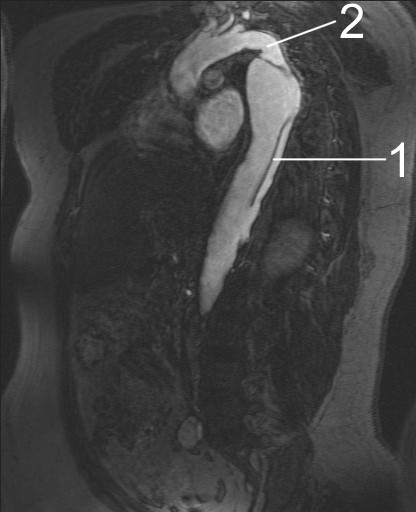
MRI of an aortic dissection 1 Aorta descendens with dissection 2 Aorta isthmus

Vessels and organs that are perfused from a false lumen may be well-perfused to varying degrees, from normal perfusion to no perfusion. In some cases, little to no end-organ damage or failure may be seen. Similarly, vessels and organs perfused from the true lumen but distal to the dissection may be perfused to varying degrees. In the above example, if the aortic dissection extended from proximal to the left subclavian artery takeoff to the mid descending aorta, the common iliac arteries would be perfused from the true lumen distal to the dissection but would be at risk for malperfusion due to occlusion of the true lumen of the aorta by the false lumen.

== Types ==
Examples include:

- Aortic dissection (aorta)
- Coronary artery dissection (coronary artery) also referred to as spontaneous coronary artery dissection or SCAD
- Pulmonary artery dissection (pulmonary artery) an extremely rare condition as a complication of pulmonary hypertension
- Carotid artery dissection (carotid artery)
- Vertebral artery dissection (vertebral artery)

Carotid and vertebral artery dissection are grouped together as "Cervical artery dissection" (CeAD).

== Common features ==
As a disease family, arterial dissections share common features, including shared genetic risk variants, and commonly perturbed molecular pathways. This includes dysfunction of the TGF-β pathway, extracellular matrix pathways, cellular metabolism and vascular smooth muscle cell contractility. Variants in genes including Collagen genes COL1A1, COL1A2, COL3A1, COL4A1, COL5A2, as well as extracellular matrix genes FBN1, FBN2, LOX, MFAP5; TGF-β pathways genes LRP1, TGFBR2, TGFB2; cytoskeletal/contractile pathway genes and PHACTR1, MYLK, PRKG1, and TLN1; and vascular smooth muscle cell gene SLC2A10 have all been implicated in at least two types of arterial dissection. Certain comorbidities, such as lupus, may also increase the risk of arterial dissection.
