= Journal of Cosmetic Dermatology =

The Journal of Cosmetic Dermatology is a quarterly peer-reviewed medical journa published by Wiley-Blackwell. It is the official journal of the International Academy of Cosmetic Dermatology and covers all aspects of cosmetic dermatology. The editor-in-chief is Zoe Diana Draelos. The journal was established in 2002 by Dr Christopher Rowland Payne. According to the Journal Citation Reports, the journal has a 2014 impact factor of 0.876.
