= Ptosis crutches =

Ptosis crutches (also known as eye crutches) are a non-surgical solution to ptosis, also known as drooping eyelid syndrome. Affected eyes do not have the ability to open and close properly. In severe cases, a person is not able to open the affected eyelid. Ptosis eye crutches are tools installed to existing eyewear that support the affected eyelid, enabling the eyelid to stay open and allowing an individual to see.

== Medical uses ==
Crutches are used to keep an eyelid from drooping due to ptosis. Individuals with ptosis who are not candidates for reparable surgery or are looking for an alternative treatment, may consider ptosis crutches.

A ptosis crutch is bar that is placed along the inside of an eyewire frame that supports the drooping eyelid. The crutch is positioned where the orbital fold would typically be without ptosis. The crutch should create a fold above the eye, tucking the lid in and raising it above the pupil.

The ptosis crutch is designed around the shape and contour of the eye. It is typically made out of metal wire. To create the crutch, measurements must be first taken to determine the depth of the ptosis eye crutch.

An optician may use a distometer or a millimeter ruler to take measurements. The distometer is held against the ocular side of the frame, at the middle of the upper eyewire. Measurements are then taken from the deepest point under the eyelid, up to where it meets the overhang of the eyewear's eyewire. Most measurements come in between 15 and 20 millimeters, but extended or reduced lengths may occur too.

It is important that the eyewear is properly adjusted to the back of the ears. Sometimes cable temples are recommendable for optimal functionality.

Ptosis crutches are a little-known option and are an alternative to surgery or eyelids that may not be currently repairable. Many optometrists may be unaware of it or may not know how to install the crutch on an existing pair of eyeglasses. A number of eyeglass companies can install ptosis crutches to new or existing frames.

== Types of ptosis crutches ==
There are two main types of ptosis crutches:

Adjustable Eye Crutches: This type of crutch is typically attached to the frame on the nasal side. They are easily adjusted and do not alter the frame as much as other crutches. They have their disadvantages, however: They must be constantly adjusted. This can weaken the metal at the adjustment point, and lead to broken crutches. This crutch is not commonly used and not recommended for moderate to severe cases of the ptosis condition.

Reinforced Eye-Crutches: These crutches are attached to the ends of the crutch, and are not as adjustable. Due to the double attachment, this crutch is resistant to breaking. This crutch also comes with a clear plastic coating finish, which helps with comfort, as well as those with allergy sensitivities. The reinforced eye crutch is the most viable solution for individuals with ptosis looking for non-surgical options.

== Materials used ==
Crutches are limited to what type of frames they can be placed on. Both metal and plastic frames can be used, but may have limitations. A skilled craftsman can successfully install ptosis eye crutches to almost any frame. The upper eyewire must be close to the orbit of the eyelid. Frames with large or small B measurements may be difficult to work with for ptosis crutches.

Plastic Frames: Plastic frames must be thick enough for crutches to be attached or embedded into the frame. Too-thin plastic frames will not work for ptosis crutches.

Metal Frames: Metal frames have the highest success rate for eye crutches to be installed. To attach the crutch, it must be soldered onto the eyewire. The metal must be durable. As with anything there may be limitations, but consulting with a skilled specialist can usually confirm all available options. Metal frames are recommended for ptosis crutches, as they are less likely to break during adjustments.

== Pros ==
Ptosis eye crutches help support an individual's eyelids so they are able to see.

== Cons ==
Ptosis crutches can be uncomfortable if they are not properly fitted. It is always helpful if an optician can take proper measurements to ensure a comfortable fit.

The crutch should not fit too tightly, as this can lead to discomfort and an irritable experience. Using an eye crutch usually results in patients being unable to blink completely, which may lead to dry eyes. A doctor may recommend eye drops for those with ptosis. Sensitivity to metals are a concern as well; it is helpful if eye crutches are made with non-allergenic metals, such as titanium/nickel alloys. Ptosis crutches should be kept clean. Mild soaps, specific eyeglass cleaning solutions, and proper coatings may help with maintenance. The lid should be monitored for several days as the crutch can create a moist environment in the lid.
