= Ciliospinal reflex =

The ciliospinal reflex (pupillary-skin reflex) consists of dilation of the ipsilateral pupil in response to pain applied to the neck, face, and upper trunk. If the right side of the neck is subjected to a painful stimulus, the right pupil dilates (increases in size 1-2mm from baseline). This reflex is absent in Horner's syndrome and lesions involving the cervical sympathetic fibers. The enhanced ciliospinal reflex in asymptomatic patients with cluster headache is due to preganglionic sympathetic mechanisms.
