= Henry Pancoast =

American radiologist

Henry Khunrath Pancoast (February 26, 1875 – May 20, 1939) was an American radiologist. He identified contrast media for use in radiology studies, and served prominent roles in early radiological professional organizations. Pancoast tumors, a type of lung tumour, are named after him.

Pancoast was born in Philadelphia to prominent Quaker parents; his father, Seth Pancoast, was also a doctor. He was educated at Friends’ Central School and went on to the University of Pennsylvania (Penn) Medical School, graduating in 1898.

== Professional life ==
His first medical job was at the Hospital of the University of Pennsylvania (HUP), starting surgical training there in 1900. When the hospital's first chief skiagrapher (radiologist), Charles Lester Leonard, retired, Pancoast succeeded him and served as the chairman of the department from 1902 to 1939. In 1911, he was also appointed professor of radiology (roentgenology), the first in the United States. Following his retirement, Pancoast was succeeded by Eugene P. Pendergrass.

In his work at Penn, Pancoast developed the use of bismuth and barium as contrast media to better differentiate certain anatomy in x-ray images. He also recognized and described the effect of prolonged radiation on the development of leukemia. In his tenure at Penn, he also pioneered the use of radiation to treat leukemia and Hodgkin's disease, though he is perhaps best known for his identification and description of a particular lung tumor that now bears his name—Pancoast tumor.

In addition to his hospital and academic work, Pancoast was active in outside professional organizations. He served as founding president of the American Board of Radiology, and in 1933 was also president of the first American Congress of Radiology, which met in Chicago in September of that year, coincident with the Chicago World's Fair.

He also traveled to numerous gatherings of medical faculty and staff, to describe the use and value of diagnostic x-rays and to explain irradiation procedures to treat malignancies.

== Personal life ==
Pancoast married Clara Louise Boggs in Brown Memorial Presbyterian Church, Baltimore, Maryland, in 1903.

Henry Pancoast died in Merion, Pennsylvania in 1939.
