= Müller's muscle =

Müller's muscle can refer to:

- Superior tarsal muscle
- Orbitalis muscle
- Circular fibres of the ciliary muscle
