= Birth trauma =

Birth trauma may refer to:

- Birth trauma (physical), physical trauma to the infant following childbirth, as described at ICD-10 codes P10-P15
- Birth trauma (psychoanalysis), a concept in Freudian psychoanalysis described by Otto Rank

== See also ==
- Childbirth-related post-traumatic stress disorder, psychological trauma to the mother following childbirth
