= Phosphatase and actin regulator 1 =

Protein-coding gene in the species Homo sapiens

PHACTR1

Identifiers
- Aliases: PHACTR1, RPEL, RPEL1, dJ257A7.2, phosphatase and actin regulator 1, EIEE70, DEE70
- External IDs: OMIM: 608723; MGI: 2659021; HomoloGene: 33597; GeneCards: PHACTR1; OMA:PHACTR1 - orthologs

Gene location (Human)
Chr.	Chromosome 6 (human)
Band	6p24.1	Start	12,716,312 bp
Band	6p24.1	End	13,290,446 bp

Gene location (Mouse)
Chr.	Chromosome 13 (mouse)
Band	13|13 A4	Start	42,834,099 bp
Band	13|13 A4	End	43,292,002 bp
RNA expression pattern
Bgee	Human / Mouse (ortholog); Top expressed in: postcentral gyrus; nucleus accumbens; ganglionic eminence; prefrontal cortex; superior frontal gyrus; right frontal lobe; caudate nucleus; dorsolateral prefrontal cortex; entorhinal cortex; putamen / Top expressed in: nucleus accumbens; dorsal striatum; superior frontal gyrus; olfactory tubercle; visual cortex; primary visual cortex; lateral septal nucleus; Rostral migratory stream; prefrontal cortex; temporal lobe; More reference expression data
BioGPS	n/a
Gene ontology
Molecular function	protein phosphatase inhibitor activity; protein phosphatase 1 binding; actin binding; protein phosphatase regulator activity
Cellular component	cytoplasm; cytosol; cell junction; synapse; nucleus
Biological process	actin cytoskeleton reorganization; actomyosin structure organization; stress fiber assembly; cell motility; negative regulation of phosphoprotein phosphatase activity; regulation of phosphoprotein phosphatase activity
Sources:Amigo / QuickGO
Orthologs
Species	Human	Mouse
Entrez	221692	218194
Ensembl	ENSG00000112137	ENSMUSG00000054728
UniProt	Q9C0D0	Q2M3X8
RefSeq (mRNA)	NM_001242648; NM_030948; NM_001322308; NM_001322309; NM_001322310 NM_001322311; NM_001322312; NM_001322313; NM_001322314; NM_001374581; NM_001374582; NM_001374583; NM_001374584	NM_001005740; NM_001005748; NM_198419; NM_001302635; NM_001302636
RefSeq (protein)	NP_001229577; NP_001309237; NP_001309238; NP_001309239; NP_001309240 NP_001309241; NP_001309242; NP_001309243; NP_112210; NP_001361510; NP_001361511; NP_001361512; NP_001361513	NP_001005740; NP_001005748; NP_001289564; NP_001289565
Location (UCSC)	Chr 6: 12.72 – 13.29 Mb	Chr 13: 42.83 – 43.29 Mb
PubMed search
- Wikidata
View/Edit Human	View/Edit Mouse

Phosphatase and actin regulator 1 (PHACTR1) is a protein that in humans is encoded by the PHACTR1 gene on chromosome 6. It is most significantly expressed in the globus pallidus of the brain. PHACTR1 is an actin and protein phosphatase 1 (PP1) binding protein that binds actin and regulates the reorganization of the actin cytoskeleton. This protein has been associated with coronary artery disease and migraines through genome-wide association studies. The PHACTR1 gene also contains one of 27 SNPs associated with increased risk of coronary artery disease.

== Structure ==
=== Gene ===
The PHACTR1 gene resides on chromosome 6 at the band 6p24.1 and includes 19 exons. This gene produces 2 isoforms through alternative splicing.

=== Protein ===
PHACTR1 is a member of the phosphatase and actin regulator family and contains 4 RPEL repeats, three of which reside at the C-terminal and bind three actin monomers. PHACTR1 binds PP1 in the region containing these RPEL repeats. PHACTR1 wraps around PP1 in a similar way to other PP1 cofactors using a non-canonical RVxF motif, a ΦΦ motif, an Arg motif and a Trp motif. PHACTR1-PP1 complex is an active holophosphatase that binds and dephosphorylates substrates in sequence-denpendent manner.

PHACTR1 is also predicted to contain 8 PKA phosphorylation sites and 7 PKC phosphorylation sites found near the RPEL repeats.

== Function ==
PHACTR1 is a PP1 binding protein, which is reported to be highly expressed in brain and which controls PP1 activity and F-actin remodeling. PHACTR1 can be induced by NRP and VEGF through NRP-1 and VEGF-R1 receptors to control tubulogenesis, actin polymerization, and lamellipodial dynamics. Through this function, PHACTR1 is suggested to play a role in cell motility and vascular morphogenesis. Meanwhile, suppression of PHACTR1 increases expression of death cell receptors, leading to extrinsic apoptosis.

The PHACTR1 locus is commonly identified in multiple genome-wide association studies investigating coronary artery disease and myocardial infarction (MI). However, little is known about the function of PHACTR1 in the heart.

== Clinical significance ==
Upregulation of PHACTR1 by transforming growth factor (TGF)-β has been described in breast cancer cell lines, potentially pointing to a connection with the TGF-β signaling pathway, which is also implicated in genetic predisposition to migraines and has a key role in Marfan and Loeys-Dietz syndromes, two inherited connective tissue disorders causing aortic dissection.

In humans, genome-wide association studies have linked PHACTR1 to coronary artery disease. Considering that arterial calcification is a well-known risk factor for coronary artery disease and myocardial infarction, one study tested ~2.5 million SNPs for an association with coronary artery calcification and aortic calcification in 2620 male individuals who were current or former heavy smokers and underwent chest CT scans in the NELSON trial. No SNPs were associated with aortic calcification on a genome-wide scale. The 9p21 locus was significantly associated with coronary artery calcification (rs1537370). Subsequently, two loci at ADAMTS7 (rs3825807) and at PHACTR1 (rs12526453) showed a nominally significant association with coronary artery calcification and an increased degree of arterial calcification.

=== Clinical marker ===
Additionally, a multi-locus genetic risk score study based on a combination of 27 loci, including the PHACTR1 gene, identified individuals at increased risk for both incident and recurrent coronary artery disease events, as well as an enhanced clinical benefit from statin therapy. The study was based on a community cohort study (the Malmo Diet and Cancer study) and four additional randomized controlled trials of primary prevention cohorts (JUPITER and ASCOT) and secondary prevention cohorts (CARE and PROVE IT-TIMI 22).

Another genome-wide association study in 2,326 clinic-based German and Dutch individuals with migraine without aura identified that PHACTR1 (together with ASTN2) as susceptibility loci for migraine without aura, thereby expanding our knowledge of this debilitating neurological disorder.

In a genome-wide association meta-analysis, PHACTR1 was also identified as a potential key driver of spontaneous coronary artery dissection (SCAD). The study examined data from nearly 2000 SCAD patients and found PHACTR1 and 15 other genes are responsible for subtle genetic changes to SCAD patients blood vessels, increasing the risk of a spontaneous bleed or tear in the wall of the arteries in the heart.
