= Papuloerythroderma of Ofuji =

- Specialty: Dermatology

Papuloerythroderma of Ofuji is a rare disorder most commonly found in Japan, characterized by itchy papules that spare the skinfolds, producing bands of uninvolved skin, creating the so-called deck-chair sign. Frequently patients present with an abnormally high concentration of eosinophils, a type of white blood cell. Skin biopsies reveal a dense infiltrate of lymphocytes and histiocytes, eosinophils in the papillary dermis, and increased Langerhans cells (S-100 positive). Systemic steroids are the treatment of choice and may result in long-term remissions.

It was characterized in 1984.

Use of psoralen and UVA (PUVA) in treatment has been described.

== See also ==
- Pruritus
- List of cutaneous conditions
- Erythroderma
