= CSF tap test =

Medical test

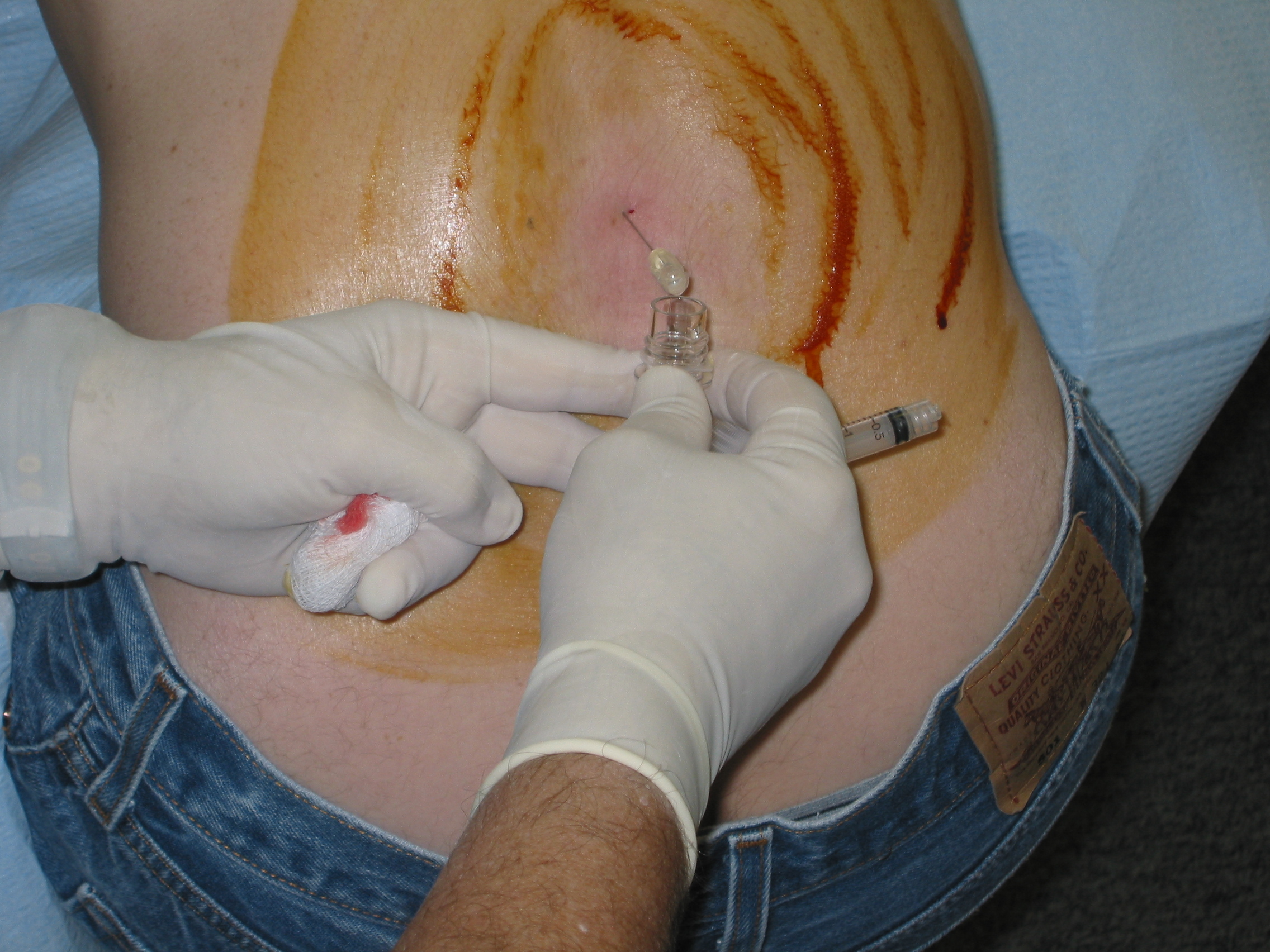
- Lumbar puncture
- Synonyms: Lumbar tap test
- Purpose: test to decide shunting of cerebrospinal fluid

The CSF tap test, sometimes lumbar tap test or Miller Fisher Test, is a medical test that is used to decide whether shunting of cerebrospinal fluid (CSF) would be helpful in a patient with suspected normal pressure hydrocephalus (NPH). The test involves removing 30–50 ml of CSF through a lumbar puncture, after which motor and cognitive function is clinically reassessed. The name "Fisher test" is after C. Miller Fisher, a Canadian neurologist working in Boston, Massachusetts, who described the test.

Clinical improvement showed a high predictive value for subsequent success with shunting. A "negative" test has a very low predictive accuracy, as many patients may improve after a shunt in spite of lack of improvement after CSF removal.
