= Pancoast tumor =

- Other names: Pulmonary sulcus tumor, superior sulcus tumor
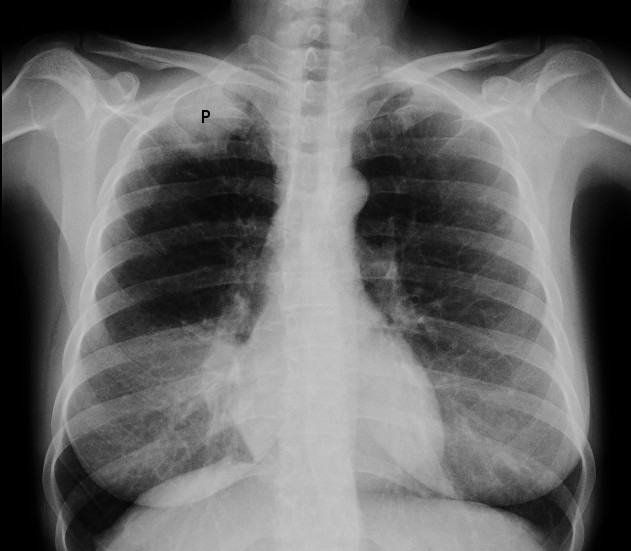
- Chest X-ray showing a Pancoast tumor (labeled as P, non-small cell lung carcinoma, right lung), from a 47-year-old female smoker.
- Specialty: Oncology
- Risk factors: Smoking

A Pancoast tumor is a tumor of the apex of the lung. It is a type of lung cancer defined primarily by its location situated at the top end of either the right or left lung. It typically spreads to nearby tissues such as the ribs and vertebrae. Most Pancoast tumors are non-small-cell lung cancers.

The growing tumor can cause compression of many nearby structures, such as the brachiocephalic vein, subclavian artery, phrenic nerve, recurrent laryngeal nerve, vagus nerve, or, characteristically, compression of a sympathetic ganglion (the stellate ganglion), which results in various presenting symptoms, most notably a range of symptoms known as Horner's syndrome due to compression of nearby sympathetic nerves.

Pancoast tumors are named for Henry Pancoast, an American radiologist, who first described them in 1924 and 1932.

Though many advances in their treatment have been made since their initial categorization, Pancoast tumors remain difficult to treat due to low rates of possible surgical intervention, therefore prognosis is still poor.

== History ==
The Pancoast tumor was first described by Hare in 1838 as a "tumor involving certain nerves". It was not until 1924 that the tumor was described in further detail, when Henry Pancoast, a radiologist from Philadelphia, published an article in which he reported and studied many cases of apical chest tumors that all shared the same radiographic findings and associated clinical symptoms, such as pain in the upper extremity following the distribution of the eighth cervical, first and second thoracic nerve trunks, as well as "sympathetic phenomena". Pancoast went on to publish a second article in 1932 in which a name was finally given to the tumor, "superior pulmonary sulcus tumor".

== Epidemiology ==
The Pancoast tumor is one of the rarer forms of lung cancer, only accounting for about 3–5% of lung cancer cases, with lung cancer in general being the second most common type of cancer occurring worldwide.

Like most other lung cancers, Pancoast tumors are more often seen in men and older people, with the average age of diagnosis being between 60 and 70 years old.

== Signs and symptoms ==
Aside from constitutional symptoms of cancer such as malaise, fever, weight loss and fatigue, most common initial presentation of a Pancoast tumor is that of shoulder pain and upper back pain, present in up to 96% of patients. Typical lung cancer-related pulmonary symptoms, such as shortness of breath, cough and hemoptysis, are often uncommon during the early stages of the disease due to the tumor's peripheral location in the lung.

Typically, other presentations are due to the effects of extension of the tumor into nearby structures, such as ribs, vasculature, and nerves. The results of one of these invasions is the presentation of the Horner's syndrome, which can be seen in 15–50% of patients with severe cases when involvement of the paravertebral sympathetic chain and cervical ganglion occur. A complete Horner's syndrome consists of ipsilateral miosis (constriction of the pupils), anhidrosis (lack of sweating), ptosis (drooping of the eyelid), and pseudo enophthalmos (as a result of the ptosis). In progressive cases, the brachial plexus is also affected, causing pain and weakness in the muscles of the arm and hand with a symptomatology typical of thoracic outlet syndrome. The tumor can also compress the recurrent laryngeal nerve and from this a hoarse voice and "bovine" (non-explosive) cough may occur.

If obstruction of the superior vena cava by the Pancoast tumor occurs, a resulting mass effect called the superior vena cava syndrome occurs, resulting in facial swelling cyanosis and dilatation of the veins of the head and neck. This syndrome can be seen in 5-10% of patient cases.

When the triad of an ipsilateral Horner's syndrome, shoulder/arm pain and weakness of the intrinsic hand muscles occurs, the presentation is called the Pancoast syndrome. This syndrome is due to involvement of brachial plexus roots and that of sympathetic fibers as they exit the cord at T1 and ascend to the superior cervical ganglion.

== Causes and risk factors ==
Due to the location of a Pancoast tumor being in the lung, the main causes are similar to various other causes of lung cancer in general, such as:

- Smoking or secondary smoke exposure
- Exposure to harmful chemicals (radon gas, asbestos, and heavy metals)
- Advanced age
- Male sex

== Diagnosis ==
Diagnosis of a Pancoast tumor can be difficult in the early stages due to the similarity of its symptoms with other conditions such as arthritis, with shoulder pain being one of the only symptoms that might indicate further imaging for a patient. Though a chest x-ray is a good screening test and might be the first mode of imaging used, they are not easily seen during the early stages of the disease due to their size and location in the chest.

Following the initial imaging, a CT scan or MRI is preferred since both can provide more details and information such as size, lymph node involvement and other areas of invasion, such as vascular involvement.

A biopsy of the lesion is typically required in order to confirm diagnosis and to provide information regarding histology and molecular markers, which in turn allow to assess for best course of treatment. Currently, the most sensitive method is that of a percutaneous transthoracic needle biopsy.

It is important to consider other possible causes with similar physical presentation to the Pancoast tumor. Such conditions to consider as part of a differential diagnosis include:

- Lymphoma
- Hemangiopericytoma
- Adenoid Cystic Carcinoma
- Plasmacytoma
- Mesothelioma
- Pulmonary metastatic malignancies, particularly from the cervix, larynx, liver, bladder, and thyroid gland

=== Tumor staging ===
Pancoast tumors are staged similarly to most other non-small cell lung cancers using the tumor, node, and metastasis (TNM system) as well as numbers (1-4) to indicate severity. At time of diagnosis, due to difficulty of early detection through imaging, most Pancoast tumors are usually staged at level T3 or T4 due to their invasion of the chest wall and local nerve structures.

== Prognosis ==
Advances in treatment and research have greatly improved survival rates over time, yet due to the later detection of most Pancoast tumors, the prognosis of the disease is still not always favorable and varies depending various factors such as time of detection, extent of invasion of the tumor, lymph node involvement and whether or not the tumor is resectable.

Currently, the five year prognosis on average is about 30% and up to 50% in patients with early-stage and surgically resectable Pancoast tumors. Unfortunately, less than 50% of tumors found in patients are actually surgically resectable, leading to poorer outcomes.

== Treatment and management ==
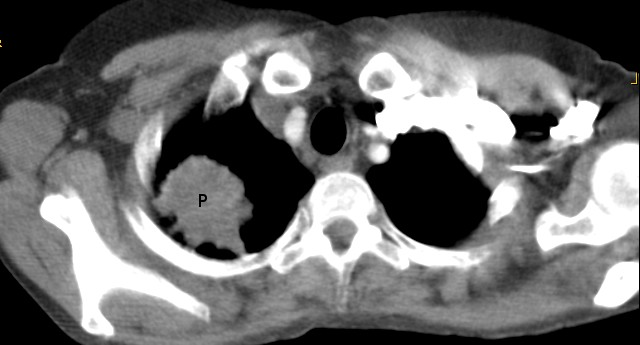
CT scan showing a Pancoast tumor (labeled as P, non-small cell lung carcinoma, left lung), from a 47-year-old female smoker

The treatment of a Pancoast lung cancer may differ from that of other types of non-small-cell lung cancer. The current standard of treatment is a combination of chemotherapy and radiotherapy, followed by surgical resection. Though complete tumor resection is recommended, its position and close proximity to vital structures (such as nerves and the spine) may make surgical intervention difficult, with many absolute contraindications present such as tumor invasion of the esophagus/trachea, more than 50% vertebral involvement among a few.

As a result, and depending on the stage of the cancer, treatment may involve radiation therapy and chemotherapy given prior to surgery (neoadjuvant treatment). Surgery may consist of the removal of the upper lobe of a lung together with its associated structures (subclavian artery, vein, branches of the brachial plexus, ribs and vertebral bodies), as well as mediastinal lymphadenectomy. Surgical access may be via thoracotomy from the back or the front of the chest and modifications. Nonsurgical treatment may consist of radiation therapy alone or clinical trials of new combinations of treatment.
