= Horner's syndrome =

Facial disorder due to damage of the sympathetic nerves

- Other names: Bernard–Horner syndrome (BH), oculosympathetic palsy
- Left-sided Horner's syndrome
- Specialty: Neurology

Horner's syndrome, also known as oculosympathetic paresis, is a combination of symptoms that arises when a group of nerves known as the sympathetic trunk is damaged. The signs and symptoms occur on the same side (ipsilateral) as it is a lesion of the sympathetic trunk. It is characterized by miosis (a constricted pupil), partial ptosis (a weak, droopy eyelid), apparent anhidrosis (decreased sweating), with apparent enophthalmos (inset eyeball).

The nerves of the sympathetic trunk arise from the spinal cord in the chest, and from there ascend to the neck and face. The nerves are part of the sympathetic nervous system, a division of the autonomic (or involuntary) nervous system. Once the syndrome has been recognized, medical imaging and response to particular eye drops may be required to identify the location of the problem and the underlying cause.

== Signs and symptoms ==
Signs that are found in people with Horner's syndrome on the affected side of the face include the following:

- Ptosis
- Anhidrosis: inability to sweat in a normal way.
- Miosis
- Enophthalmos
- Inability to completely close or open the eyelid
- Headaches
- Loss of ciliospinal reflex: the pupils do not get bigger when the neck or face is hurt or pinched.
- Bloodshot conjunctiva: The white part of the eye (the conjunctiva) looks red. How red it is can change depending on where the problem or injury is in the eye.
- Unilateral straight hair: In congenital Horner's syndrome, the hair on the affected side of the head may be straight, whereas on the contralateral side, it is curly.
- Heterochromia iridum

Damage to the sympathetic nerves can cause several problems. The dilator muscle, which normally makes the pupil bigger, stops working. This makes the pupil smaller (miosis). The superior tarsal muscle is in the upper eyelid and helps lift it. It stops working so the upper eyelid droops (ptosis). Sweating on the face is reduced. The eye may look sunken (enophthalmos), but this is usually just because of the drooping eyelid. True sunken eyes are rare in humans but can be seen in cats, rats, and dogs with Horner's syndrome.

The reaction of the pupils to light is normal because it does not depend on sympathetic nerve supply.

Heterochromia can happen in children under two years old. If the sympathetic nerves do not send signals, the iris cannot make its natural color (melanin). This can make the two eyes different colors.

In animals, Horner's syndrome can make the third eyelid, a small extra eyelid, cover part of the eye. This eyelid usually helps protect and moisten the eye.

== Causes ==
Scheme showing sympathetic and parasympathetic innervation of the pupil and sites of a lesion in Horner's syndrome.

Horner's syndrome is usually an acquired medical condition that results from a disease, but may also be congenital (inborn, associated with heterochromatic iris, birth trauma or injury to the nerves or carotid artery during delivery, lack of development (agenesis) of the carotid artery) or iatrogenic (caused by medical treatment or medical procedures). In rare cases, Horner's syndrome may be caused by repeated, minor head trauma, such as being hit with a soccer ball. Although most causes are relatively benign, Horner's syndrome may reflect serious disease in the neck or chest (such as a Pancoast tumor or thyrocervical venous dilatation).

Causes can be divided according to the presence and location of anhidrosis (inability to sweat):

- Central (anhidrosis of face, arm and trunk)
  - Syringomyelia
  - Multiple sclerosis
  - Encephalitis
  - Brain tumors:
    - Brainstem tumors (such as gliomas)
    - Hypothalamic tumors
    - Pituitary tumors (rare, if they compress nearby structures)
  - Lateral medullary syndrome
- Preganglionic (anhidrosis of face)
  - Cervical rib traction on stellate ganglion
  - Thyroid carcinoma
  - Thyroidectomy – surgical removal of all or part of the thyroid gland
  - Goiter – swelling in the neck due to an enlarged thyroid gland
  - Bronchogenic carcinoma of the superior fissure (Pancoast tumor) on apex of lung
  - Klumpke paralysis
  - Trauma – base of neck, usually blunt trauma or trauma due to surgery (e.g., tube thoracostomy)
  - Thoracic aortic aneurysm
- Postganglionic (no anhidrosis)
  - Cluster headache – combination termed Horton's headache
  - Horner's syndrome may occur temporarily during a migraine attack and be relieved afterwards
  - Cavernous sinus thrombosis
  - Middle ear infection
- Sympathectomy
- Nerve blocks, such as cervical plexus block, stellate ganglion or interscalene block

== Pathophysiology ==
Horner's syndrome results from any disruption of the sympathetic innervation of the eye. The site of the lesion in the sympathetic outflow is on the ipsilateral side of the symptoms.

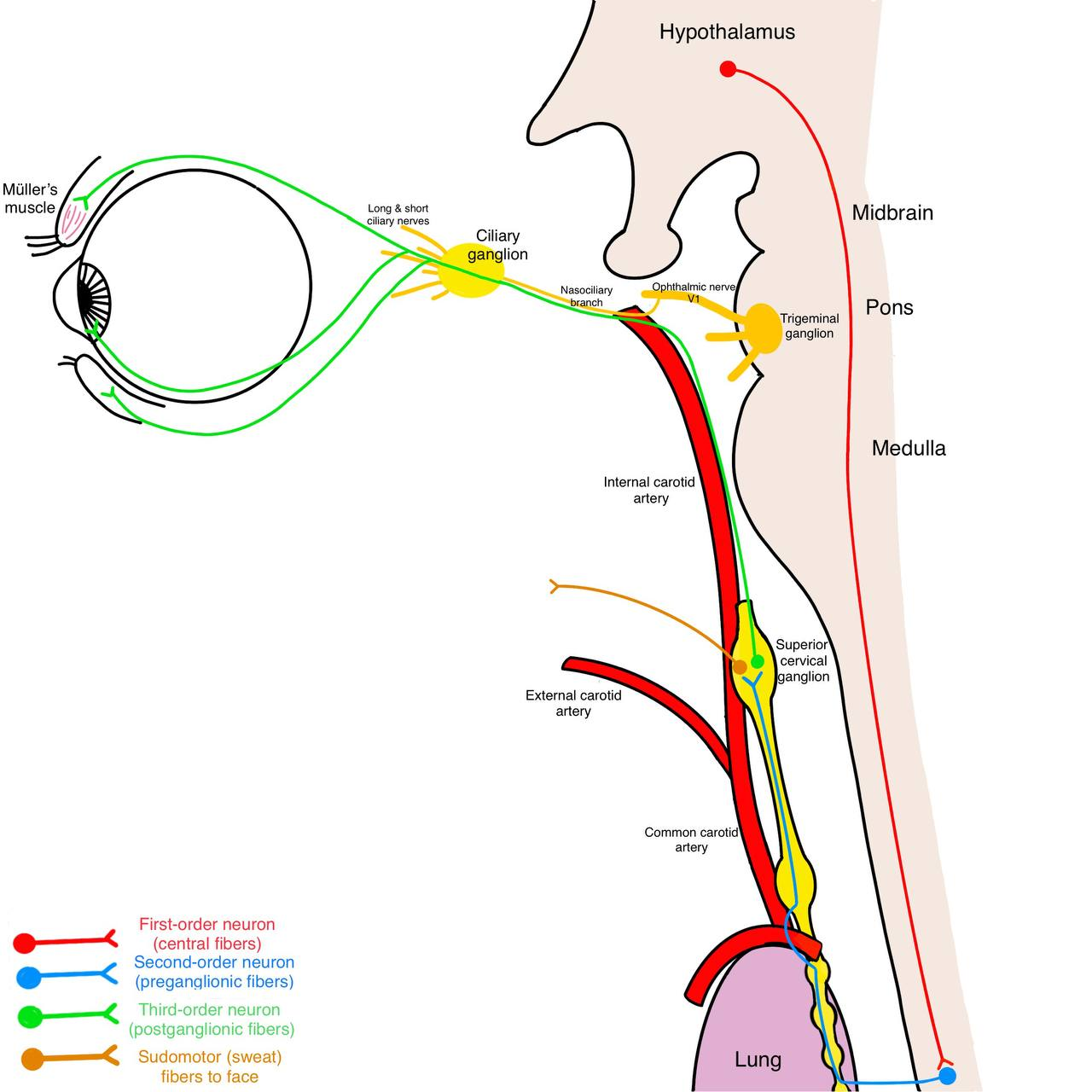
The neuronal pathway affected in Horner's syndrome

The sympathetic outflow from the brain to the eye and face consists of three routes, as follows:

1. First-order neuron (central neuron):
  1. Originates in the posterolateral side of the hypothalamus.
  2. Runs through the brainstem.
  3. Exits at the levels of C8, T1, and T2 of spinal segments, where it synapses with the second-order neuron. e.g., Central lesions affecting the Hypothalamospinal tract, like the transection of cervical spinal cord.
2. Second-order neuron:
  1. Originates at the C8, T1, and T2 spinal segments
  2. Passes over the apex of the lung.
  3. Ascends through the cervical sympathetic chain.
  4. Ends in the superior cervical ganglion, where it synapses with the third-order neuron, i.e., preganglionic lesions that cause compression of the sympathetic chain, like a lung tumor.
3. Third-order neuron:
  1. Starts at the superior cervical ganglion.
  2. Travels with the internal carotid artery.
  3. Reaches the cavernous sinus to attach to the abducens nerve (CN VI).
  4. Travels with the ophthalmic division of the trigeminal nerve (CN V1).
  5. Joins the nasociliary nerve to reach the ciliary ganglion.
  6. Ends with the long and short ciliary nerves.
  7. Supplies the pupillary dilator muscle, Müller's muscle, and lacrimal glands, i.e., postganglionic lesions that occur at the level of the internal carotid artery, like carotid artery dissection.
- Lesions in the first- and second-order neurons cause the classic Horner's syndrome. Other symptoms in these cases relate to the site of the lesion. In contrast, those of the third-order neuron may not show anhidrosis.
- Lesions distal to the carotid bifurcation do not cause anhidrosis. This happens because the facial sweat nerves travel with the external carotid artery. In such lesions, only the area above the brow shows anhidrosis. This results in partial Horner's syndrome.

== Diagnosis ==
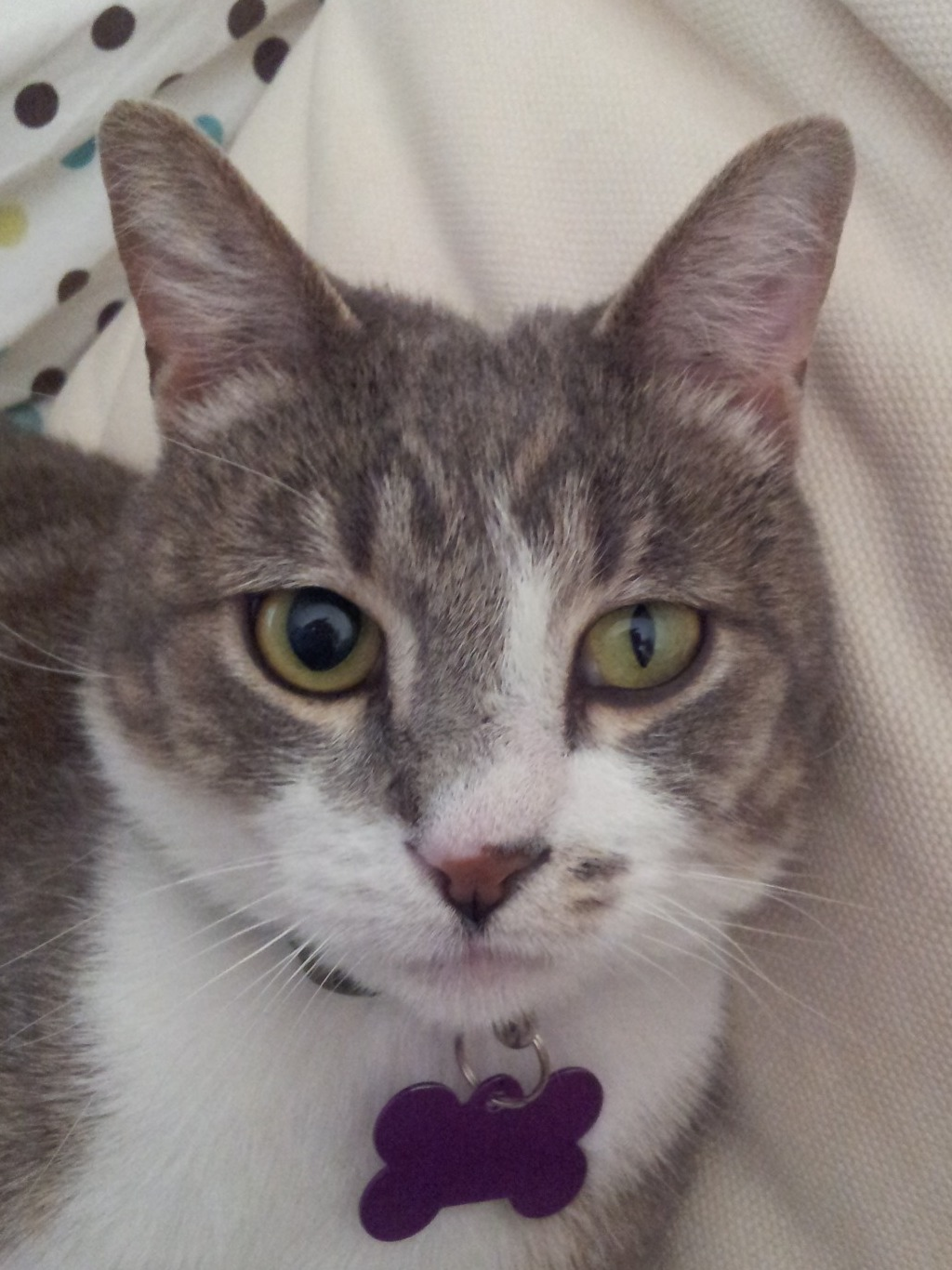
Left-sided Horner's syndrome in a cat as a result of trauma, demonstrating miosis in left pupil

Diagnosis should be considered when a patient presents with anisocoria that reacts normally to light. Normal pupillary constriction should appear in both the larger and smaller pupil. Three tests are useful in confirming the presence and severity of Horner syndrome:

- Cocaine drop test: Cocaine eyedrops block the reuptake of post-ganglionic norepinephrine resulting in the dilation of a normal pupil from retention of norepinephrine in the synapse. However, in Horner's syndrome the lack of norepinephrine in the synaptic cleft causes mydriatic failure. However, using cocaine for diagnosing Horner's syndrome is not easy. Cocaine is a controlled drug that needs to be kept secure. At the same time, it can be difficult for patients who require drug screening due to their profession. This is because metabolites of cocaine are excreted in urine for up to 2 days after topical administration.
- Apraclonidine has largely replaced cocaine as the first-line pharmacologic agent for the diagnosis of Horner syndrome in routine clinical practice. Apraclonidine is also used in patients with glaucoma to lower intraocular pressure. In patients with unilateral Horner's syndrome its effects cause a reversal of anisocoria. In children, however, cocaine is a preferable choice because of the side effects apraclonidine has on them.
- Paredrine test: This test helps to localize the cause of the miosis. If the third order neuron (the last of three neurons in the pathway which ultimately discharges norepinephrine into the synaptic cleft) is intact, then the amphetamine causes neurotransmitter vesicle release, thus releasing norepinephrine into the synaptic cleft and resulting in robust mydriasis of the affected pupil. If the lesion itself is of the third order neuron, then the amphetamine will have no effect and the pupil remains constricted. There is no pharmacological test to differentiate between a first and second order neuron lesion.

It is important to distinguish the ptosis caused by Horner's syndrome from the ptosis caused by a lesion to the oculomotor nerve. In the former, the ptosis occurs with a constricted pupil (due to a loss of sympathetics to the eye), whereas in the latter, the ptosis occurs with a dilated pupil (due to a loss of innervation to the sphincter pupillae). In a clinical setting, these two ptoses are fairly easy to distinguish. In addition to the blown pupil in a CNIII (oculomotor nerve) lesion, this ptosis is much more severe, occasionally occluding the whole eye. The ptosis of Horner syndrome can be quite mild or barely noticeable (partial ptosis).

Clinicians evaluating Horner's syndrome should be aware of Rowland Payne syndrome because concurrent findings such as hoarseness or hemidiaphragm elevation indicate a more extensive lesion at the thoracic inlet, rather than an isolated sympathetic pathway disorder. Rowland Payne syndrome is a rare clinical entity characterised by the triad of ipsilateral Horner syndrome, vocal cord palsy, and hemidiaphragm paralysis. It results from simultaneous involvement of the cervical sympathetic chain, recurrent laryngeal nerve, and phrenic nerve at the lower neck or thoracic inlet. The syndrome is most often caused by malignant tumours such as breast or lung carcinoma, but may also occur after trauma or infection. It was first described by Dr Christopher Rowland Payne in 1981 following a report of three cases.

== Imaging strategies ==
Imaging can help localize the defect in certain cases. For central Horner's syndrome MRI is recommended. The imaging is done from the brain to the upper thoracic spinal cord. In preganglionic and postganglionic Horner's syndrome, the imaging is done with computed tomography (CT) angiography from the orbits to T4-T5. When the clinical evaluation does not reveal localizing signs, the syndrome is considered isolated.

== Treatment ==
Horner's syndrome is not considered a primary disease, but a sign of underlying conditions resulting from disruption of the sympathetic nerve pathway supplying the eye and face, which do not require direct treatment. Suitable management focuses on identifying the cause or condition that is typically secondary to lesions along the oculosympathetic pathway, such as carotid artery dissection, brainstem stroke, neoplasms (e.g., Pancoast tumor), trauma, or demyelinating diseases. There can be varied treatments based on the etiology: Vascular (carotid dissection) may need anticoagulation or antiplatelet therapy while neoplastic may need surgery, radiation, or chemotherapy. As a rule, the ptosis and miosis induced by Horner syndrome will not require treatment as a primary concern, although apraclonidine eye drops or eyelid surgery can provide short-term cosmetic benefit in some cases.

Urgent assessment is necessary when symptoms come on acutely with neck pain or neurologic deficits, as these may reflect life-threatening processes such as carotid dissection or intracranial lesions. The symptoms will usually resolve spontaneously or after the underlying condition is treated successfully.

== History ==
The syndrome is named after Johann Friedrich Horner, the Swiss ophthalmologist who first described the syndrome in 1869. Several others had previously described cases, but "Horner's syndrome" is most prevalent. In France and Italy, Claude Bernard is also eponymized with the condition (Claude Bernard–Horner syndrome, abbreviated CBH). In France, Francois Pourfour du Petit is also credited with describing this syndrome.

== Children ==
The most common causes in young children are birth trauma and a type of cancer called neuroblastoma. Isolated Horner syndrome can be the first symptom of neuroblastoma. The cause of about a third of cases in children is unknown.

== See also ==
- Harlequin syndrome
