= Ptosis (eyelid) =

Drooping of the upper eyelid over the eye

Ptosis of the eyelids
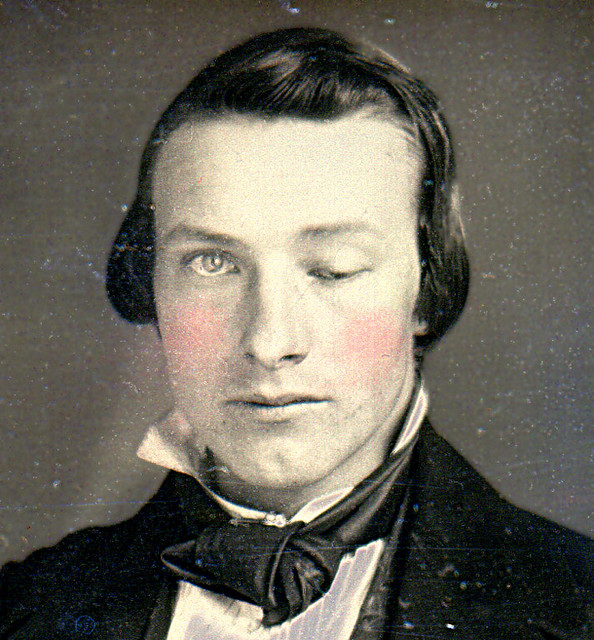
- Ptosis of the left eyelid (unilateral ptosis). A headshot daguerreotype of an unidentified male, by William Bell in 1852.
- Pronunciation: /ˈtoʊsɪs/
- Specialty: Ophthalmology, optometry, neurology

Ptosis, also known as blepharoptosis, is a drooping or falling of the upper eyelid. This condition is sometimes called "lazy eye", but that term normally refers to the condition amblyopia. If severe enough and left untreated, the drooping eyelid can cause other conditions, such as amblyopia or astigmatism, so it is especially important to treat the disorder in children before it can interfere with vision development.

== Signs and symptoms ==
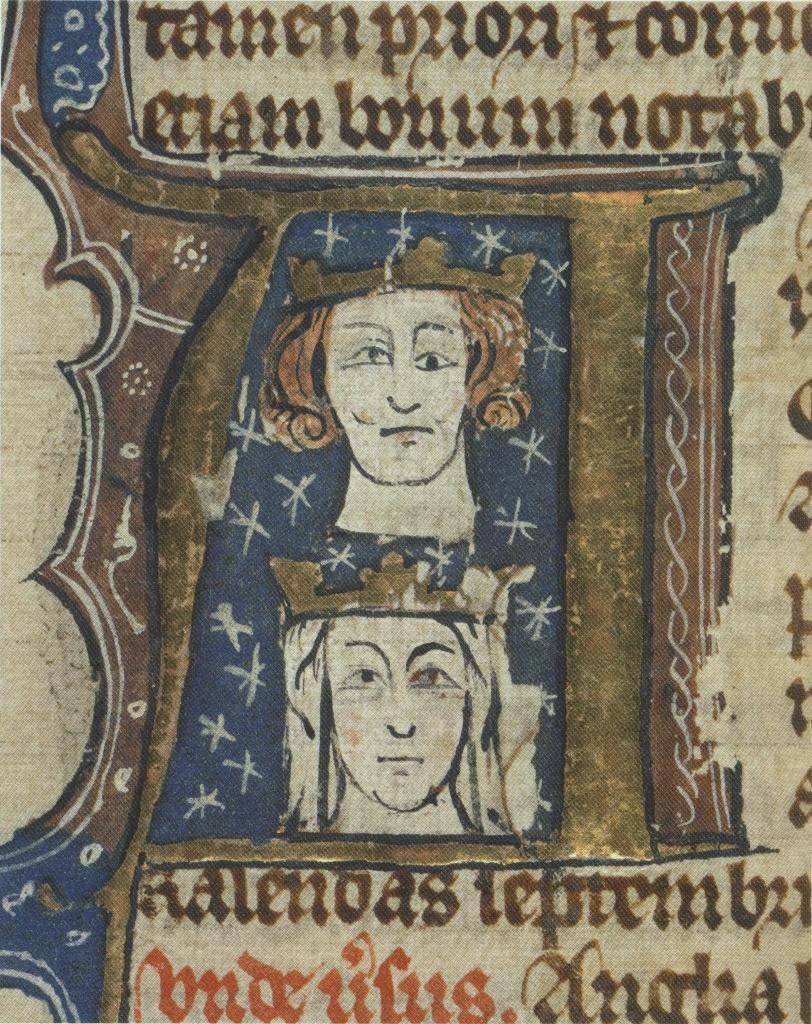
Early fourteenth-century manuscript initial showing King Edward I of England and his wife Eleanor of Castile. The artist has depicted Edward's blepharoptosis, a trait he inherited from his father, King Henry III.

Ptosis can be unilateral or bilateral, and may vary in severity. Common signs and symptoms include:

- Drooping of the upper eyelid, which may partially or completely cover the pupil.
- Reduced vertical palpebral fissure height.
- Compensatory frontalis overaction, leading to elevation of the eyebrows and forehead wrinkling.
- Chin-up head posture in children or severe cases to improve the visual field.
- Obstruction of the visual axis, especially in more severe cases.
- Fatigability, or worsening of the ptosis as the day progresses, if the cause is a myasthenic ptosis.
- Absent or poor upper eyelid skin crease formation.
- In congenital ptosis, reduced or absent levator palpebral superioris function is often observed.

=== Complications ===
Ptosis can lead to various complications, including refractive errors. When ptosis obstructs the upper field of vision, affected individuals may compensate by tilting their head back or raising their eyebrows, which can result in astigmatism or other refractive errors due to the altered positioning of the eye. Additionally, ptosis can lead to eye strain and fatigue, potentially exacerbating existing refractive errors such as myopia or hyperopia. Early detection and management of ptosis, often through surgical correction, are essential to minimize these complications and ensure optimal visual health.

== Causes ==
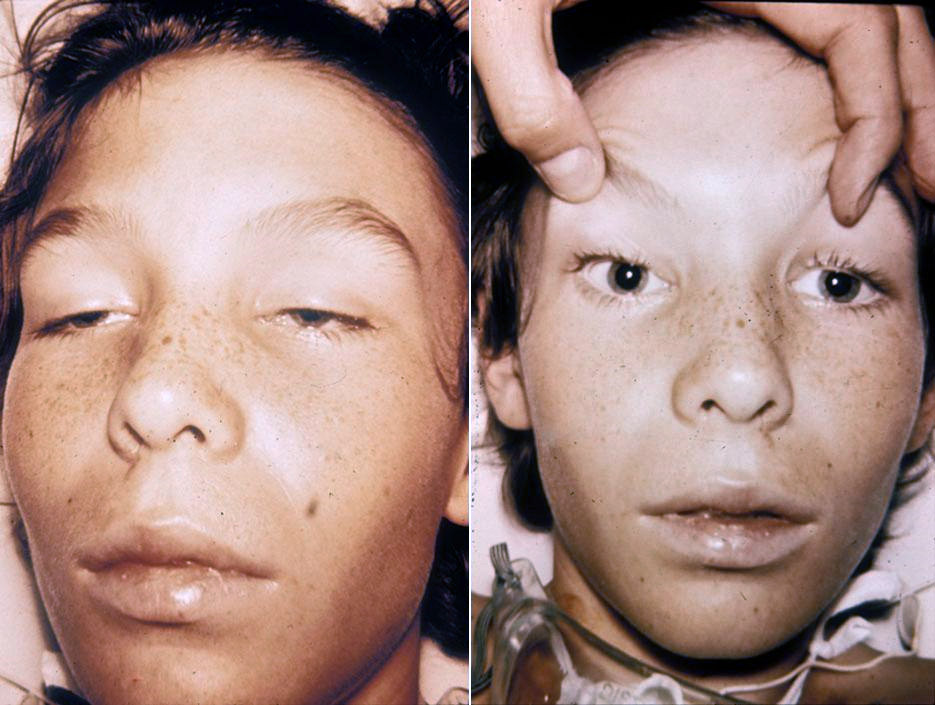
Neurotoxic ptosis caused by botulinum toxin: a 14-year-old botulism patient with bilateral total ophthalmoplegia with ptosis (left image) and dilated, fixed pupils (right image). The teenager was fully conscious.

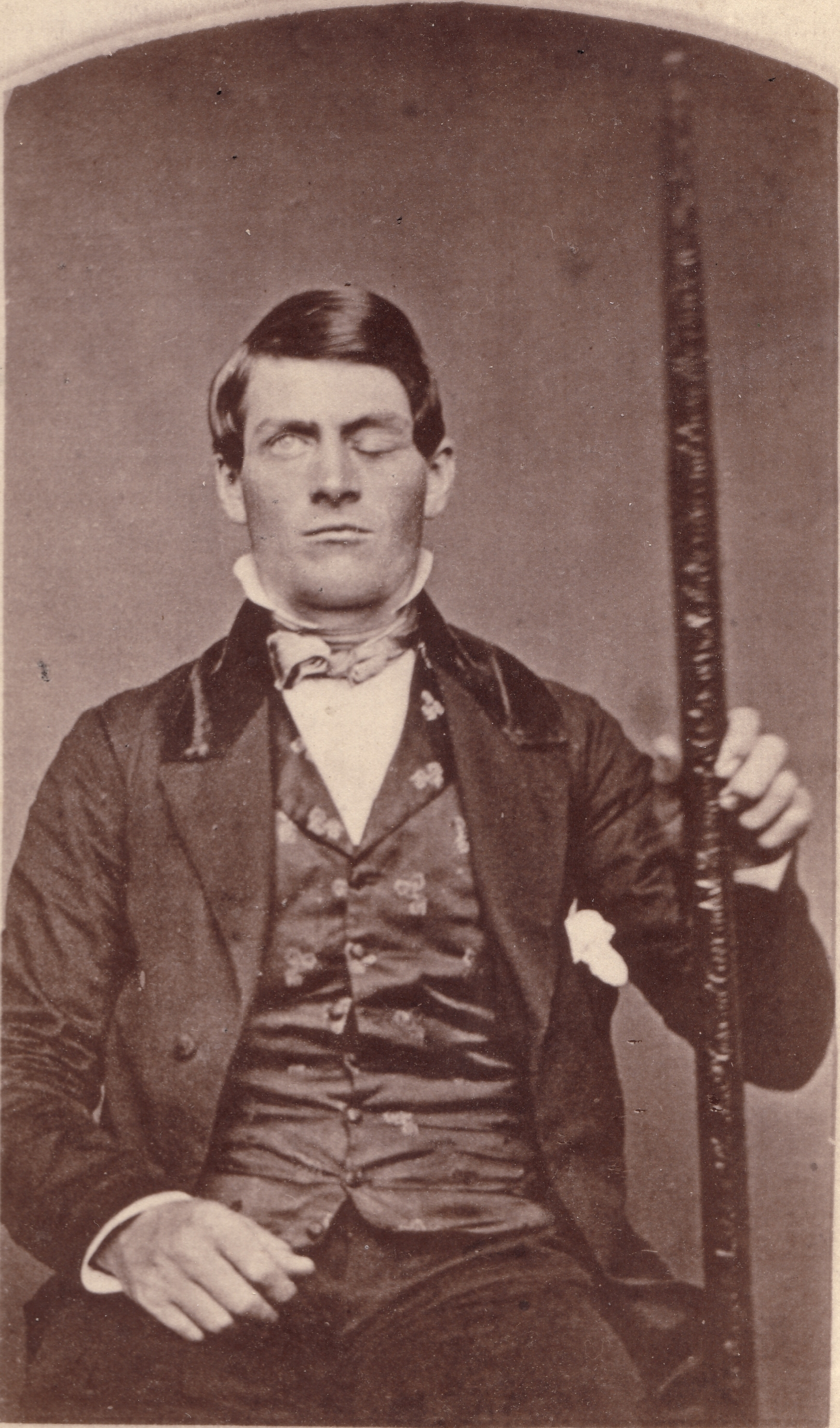
Phineas Gage displayed ptosis after surgery to treat wounds inflicted by a large iron rod entering his left cheek, passing behind his left eye, and exiting at the top of his head.

Ptosis occurs as the result of dysfunction of the muscles that raise the eyelid or their nerve supply (oculomotor nerve for the levator palpebrae superioris muscle and sympathetic nerves for the superior tarsal muscle). It can affect one eye or both eyes and is more common in the elderly, as muscles in the eyelids may begin to deteriorate. Babies may also exhibit ptosis at birth as the result of abnormal development of the levator muscle while the child is in the mother's womb. Congenital ptosis is hereditary in three main forms.

Causes of congenital ptosis remain unknown. Ptosis may be caused by damage to the muscle that raises the eyelid, damage to the superior cervical sympathetic ganglion or damage to the oculomotor nerve, which controls the muscle. Such damage could be a sign of an underlying disease such as diabetes mellitus, a brain tumor, a pancoast tumor (apex of the lung) and diseases that cause weakness in muscles or nerve damage, such as myasthenia gravis or oculopharyngeal muscular dystrophy. Exposure to the toxins in some snake venoms, such as that of the black mamba, may also cause this effect.

Ptosis can be caused by the aponeurosis of the levator muscle, nerve abnormalities, trauma, inflammation or lesions of the lid or orbit. Dysfunctions of the levators may occur as a result of autoimmune antibodies attacking and eliminating the neurotransmitter.

Ptosis may be attributable to a myogenic, neurogenic, aponeurotic, mechanical or traumatic cause, and it usually occurs in an isolated manner. However, it may be associated with various other conditions, such as immunological, degenerative or hereditary disorders as well as tumors or infections.

Acquired ptosis is most commonly caused by aponeurotic ptosis. This can occur because of senescence, dehiscence or disinsertion of the levator aponeurosis. Moreover, chronic inflammation or intraocular surgery can lead to the same effect. Also, wearing contact lenses for long periods is thought to have a certain impact on the development of the condition.

Congenital neurogenic ptosis is believed to be caused by Horner's syndrome, in which a mild ptosis may be associated with ipsilateral ptosis, iris and areola hypopigmentation and anhidrosis caused by paresis of the superior tarsal muscle. Acquired Horner syndrome may result after trauma, neoplastic insult or even vascular disease.

Ptosis caused by trauma can ensue after an eyelid laceration with transection of the upper eyelid elevators or disruption of the neural input.

Other causes of ptosis include eyelid neoplasms, neurofibromas or cicatrization after inflammation or surgery. Mild ptosis may occur with aging. A drooping eyelid can be one of the first signals of a third-nerve palsy resulting from a cerebral aneurysm that is otherwise asymptomatic, a condition known as oculomotor nerve palsy.

=== Drugs ===
Ingestion of high doses of opioid drugs such as morphine, oxycodone, heroin or hydrocodone can cause ptosis. Pregabalin, an anticonvulsant drug, has also been known to cause mild ptosis.

== Mechanism ==
Different trauma can cause and induce many different mechanisms. For example, myogenic ptosis results from a direct injury to the levator muscle and/or Müller's muscle. On the other hand, neurogenic ptosis is caused by closed head injuries or traumatically introduced neurotoxin (wasp/bee/snake venom) or botulinum toxin due to the effect of those factors on the CNIII or the sympathetic pathway. Mechanical ptosis can also occur due to scarring tissue restricting the patient's eyelid excursion or weighing down the patient's lid. Another mechanism is the disturbance of the oculomotor nerve causing the levator palpebrae to weaken, resulting in the eyelid drooping. Ptosis can also occur in a patient with brain tumors due to pressure on the third nerve, also known as the sympathetic nerve, on the brainstem.

== Pathology ==
Myasthenia gravis is a common neurogenic ptosis that could also be classified as neuromuscular ptosis because the site of pathology is at the neuromuscular junction. Studies have shown that up to 70% of myasthenia gravis patients present with ptosis, and 90% of these patients will eventually develop ptosis. In this case, ptosis can be unilateral or bilateral, and its severity tends to be oscillating during the day, because of factors such as fatigue or drug effect. This particular type of ptosis is distinguished from the others with the help of a Tensilon test and blood tests. Also specific to myasthenia gravis is the fact that coldness inhibits the activity of cholinesterase, which makes it possible to differentiate this type of ptosis by applying ice onto the eyelids. Patients with myasthenic ptosis are likely to experience a variation in the drooping of the eyelid at different hours of the day.

Ptosis caused by oculomotor palsy can be unilateral or bilateral, as the subnucleus to the levator muscle is a shared midline structure in the brainstem. In cases where the palsy is caused by the compression of the nerve by a tumor or aneurysm, it is highly likely to result in an abnormal ipsilateral papillary response and a larger pupil. Surgical third nerve palsy is characterized by a sudden onset of unilateral ptosis and an enlarged or sluggish pupil to the light. In this case, imaging tests such as CTs or MRIs should be considered. Medical third nerve palsy, contrary to surgical third nerve palsy, usually does not affect the pupil and tends to improve in several weeks slowly. Surgery to correct ptosis due to medical third nerve palsy is normally considered only if the improvement of ptosis and ocular motility are unsatisfactory after half a year. Patients with third nerve palsy tend to have a diminished or absent function of the levator.

When caused by Horner's syndrome, ptosis is usually accompanied by miosis and anhidrosis. In this case, the ptosis is due to interruption innervations to the sympathetic, autonomic Muller's muscle rather than the somatic levator palpebrae superioris muscle. The lid position and pupil size are typically affected by this condition, and the ptosis is generally mild, no more than 2 mm. The pupil might be smaller on the affected side. While 4% cocaine instilled in the eyes can confirm the diagnosis of Horner's syndrome, Hydroxyamphetamine eye drops can differentiate the location of the lesion.

Chronic progressive external ophthalmoplegia is a systemic condition that usually affects only the lid position and the external eye movement without involving the movement of the pupil. This condition accounts for nearly 45% of myogenic ptosis cases. Most patients develop ptosis due to this disease in their adulthood. A characteristic of ptosis caused by this condition is that the protective uprolling of the eyeball when the eyelids are closed is very poor.

== Diagnosis ==
A doctor will first perform a physical exam with questions about the patient's medical history to distinguish whether the condition may be hereditary. A slit lamp exam is performed with a high-intensity light that allows a close look at the patient's eyes. The doctor can also perform a test in which edrophonium is injected into a vein, and the eyelids are monitored for resulting signs of improvement.

A visual field test may be performed, which assesses the degree to which the ptosis affects the superior vision. Because nerve damage is among the possible causes of ptosis, the ophthalmologist will check the patient's pupil for abnormalities. The doctor will also check muscle function.

The ophthalmologist may also measure the degree of the eyelid droop by measuring the marginal reflex distance, which is the distance between the center of the pupil and the edge of the upper lid, as well as the strength and function of the patient's levator muscle. This test entails holding the frontalis muscle to measure how far the eyelid travels when the patient is gazing downward.

Through these tests, the ophthalmologist may properly diagnose ptosis and identify its classification, and a determination may be made regarding the course of treatment, which may involve surgery.

=== Classification ===
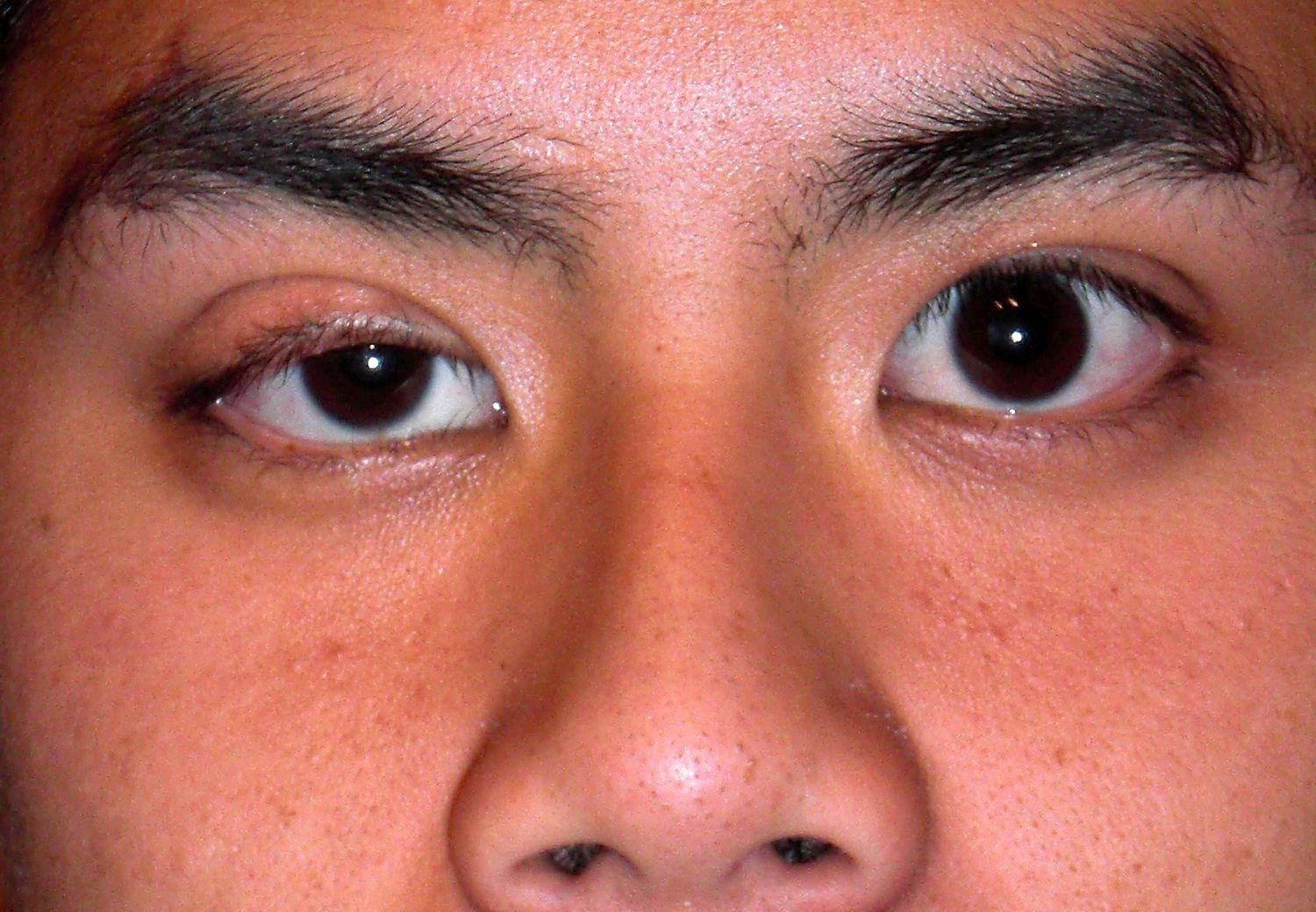
Mild right-eyelid ptosis

Depending upon the cause, ptosis may be classified into:

- Neurogenic ptosis, which includes oculomotor nerve palsy, Horner's syndrome, Marcus Gunn jaw winking syndrome and third cranial nerve misdirection.
- Myogenic ptosis, which includes oculopharyngeal muscular dystrophy, myasthenia gravis, myotonic dystrophy, ocular myopathy, simple congenital ptosis and blepharophimosis syndrome.
- Aponeurotic ptosis, which may be involutional or postoperative.
- Mechanical ptosis, which is the result of edema or tumors of the upper lid.
- Neurotoxic ptosis, which is a classic symptom of envenomation by elapid snakes such as cobras, kraits, mambas and taipans. Bilateral ptosis is usually accompanied by diplopia, dysphagia, and/or progressive muscular paralysis. Neurotoxic ptosis is a precursor to respiratory failure and eventual suffocation caused by complete paralysis of the thoracic diaphragm. It is, therefore, a medical emergency, and immediate treatment is required. Similarly, ptosis may occur in victims of botulism (caused by botulinum toxin), and this is also regarded as a life-threatening symptom.
- Pseudoptosis resulting from lack of lid support (empty socket or atrophic globe) or a higher lid position on the other side, as in lid retraction.

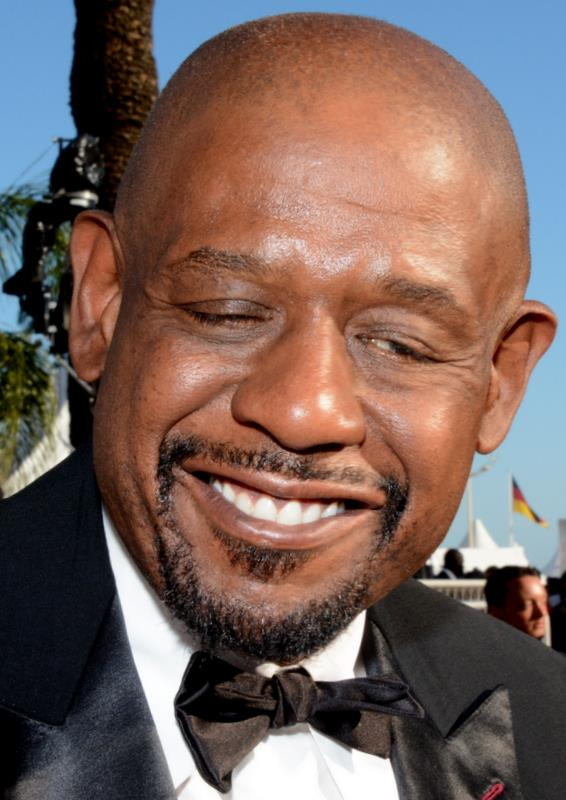
Hollywood actor Forest Whitaker has a left-eye ptosis

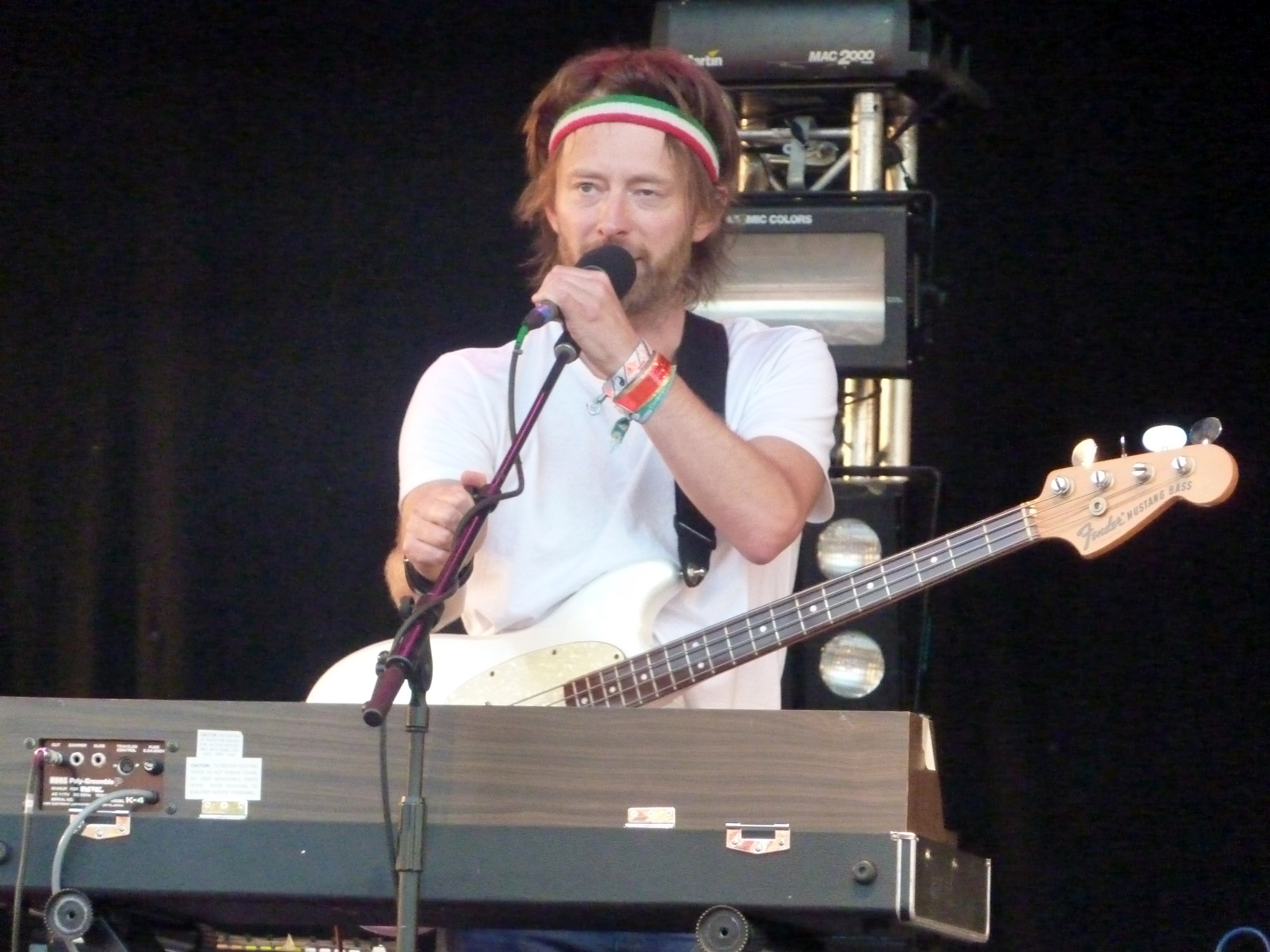
English musician and Radiohead lead vocalist Thom Yorke has a milder left-eye ptosis

== Treatment ==
Aponeurotic and congenital ptosis may require surgical correction if severe enough to interfere with the vision or if appearance is a concern. Treatment depends on the type of ptosis and is usually performed by an ophthalmic plastic surgeon or a reconstructive surgeon specializing in diseases and eyelid problems.

If the condition occurs in a child, the doctor will delay the surgery until the patient is 4 or 5 years old. If the patient is under the recommended age for surgery, the doctor will test if occlusion therapy can compensate for the patient's impeded vision. The reason for delaying the surgery until the patient is at least 4–5 years of age is the necessity of delay for the frontonasal and upper face to complete their complex growth. After this complex growth is complete, the doctors can obtain a more accurate measurement of the conditions. However, surgery will be needed sooner if the patient's vision impediment worsens or proves unresponsive to the occlusion therapy.

Surgical procedures include:

- Levator resection
- Müller muscle resection
- Frontalis sling operation (preferred option for oculopharyngeal muscular dystrophy)
- Whitnall sling

The frontalis sling surgery can only be done if the patient's ptosis condition is due to diseased or stretched-out muscles. The stretching-out of muscle is due to age. The frontalis sling surgery is done to either tighten or shorten the affected muscles, thereby allowing the process to raise the patient's lid's resting position. The procedure is done with the doctor using the sling to loop the material, then threading it underneath the patient's eyebrows and above the lashes. Once the sling has been tightened, this allows the patient's forehead's muscle to aid in lifting the lid. The sling can be looped in a pentagon or triangle (singular or double) shape. Many slings in the market today include monofilament nylon, silicone rods, polyester, silk, collagen, stainless steel, or polypropylene.

Frontalis sling surgery is considered the most effective surgical treatment for moderate to severe congenital ptosis. Many different materials can be used for the surgery, though it is currently unclear which material has the highest success rate.

The levator resection and advancement surgery should only be considered for patients who are experiencing a levator function less than or equal to 5 mm. The levator function measures the distance the eyelid travels, starting with the downgaze movement to the upgaze without moving the frontalis muscle. Although this procedure can be completed through two different approaches, the internal and the external, the external approach allows the surgeons to obtain a better view of the surgical site during the procedure. The surgeon will begin with an incision on the eyelid. Once the levator has been exposed, the surgeon either folds it or cuts it off before suturing it to the tarsal plate. During this procedure, it is up to the surgeon to decide the height and the contour of the patient's eyelid, with input from the patient.

The Whitnall sling procedure is done with an incision from the levator to the Whitnall ligament. Then the surgeon will suture the Whitnall's ligament connecting it to the superior tarsal edge. This procedure most likely is done if the patients are concerned about cosmetic appearance. The Whitnall sling procedure is able to provide a better cosmetic result because the procedure is able to keep the Whitnall's ligament intact. This allows the support of the lacrimal gland and temporal eyelid to be maintained.

Despite the gains the patient can obtain from the surgeries, there are risk factors. After the surgery, the patient may experience asymmetrical (uneven) eyelids. If the surgery is not done carefully, the patient may experience dry eyes because the eye is no longer closing fully. The patient may also experience bleeding after the surgery and infections if the surgical site is not taken care of properly. On rare occasions, the patient will experience a loss in eyelid movement.

Non-surgical modalities like the use of "crutch" glasses or ptosis crutches or special scleral contact lenses to support the eyelid may also be used.

In 2020, the United States Food and Drug Administration approved a 0.1% oxymetazoline hydrochloride ophthalmic solution for acquired blepharoptosis. Oxymetazoline is believed to work by stimulating the α_{1} and α_{2} adrenergic receptors of Müller's muscle, which helps to lift the eyelid and improve vision.

Ptosis that is caused by a disease may improve if the disease is treated successfully, although some related diseases, such as oculopharyngeal muscular dystrophy, currently have no cures.

== Prognosis ==
If the ptosis is left untreated, patients may experience amblyopia, also known as lazy eye, which can permanently damage the patient's vision. After careful observation and planning from specialists, ptosis can be successfully treated. Treatment like surgery will allow the patient to begin experiencing improvement in vision as well as cosmetic results. In a study of patients who were previously treated for ptosis, half required additional surgery within 8 to 10 years of the first surgery. If the ptosis is not related to major health issues (such as cancerous tumors or traumatic injuries), the condition will not shorten the patient's life expectancy.

== Epidemiology ==
According to ophthalmology studies done on ptosis patients, occurrence rates are as follows. The average age for females experiencing aponeurotic ptosis is 67.83 years, and the corresponding male average age is 68.19. The average age for congenital ptosis is 12.27 years for females and 8.57 years for males. The average age for mechanical ptosis is 49.41 years in females and 43.30 years in males. The average age for myogenic ptosis is 53.45 for females and 43.30 for males. The average age for neurogenic ptosis is 43.6 years in females and 32.62 years in males. Lastly, the average age for traumatic ptosis is 35.12 years in females and 33.4 years in males. Ptosis was not found to have any overall gender or racial preference.

== Research directions ==
Current studies have indicated that previous methods, such as occlusion therapy and surgery, are considered the most appropriate for treating this condition. Further studies are encouraged to be able to determine the optimal surgical indications. Any discoveries on approaches with dry eye will help further the oculoplastic surgeries.

== Etymology ==
Ptosis is derived from the Greek word πτῶσις (ptōsis, "fall"), and is defined as the "abnormal lowering or prolapse of an organ or body part."

== See also ==
- Apraxia of lid opening
- Blepharophimosis
