= Carotid artery dissection =

Human disease

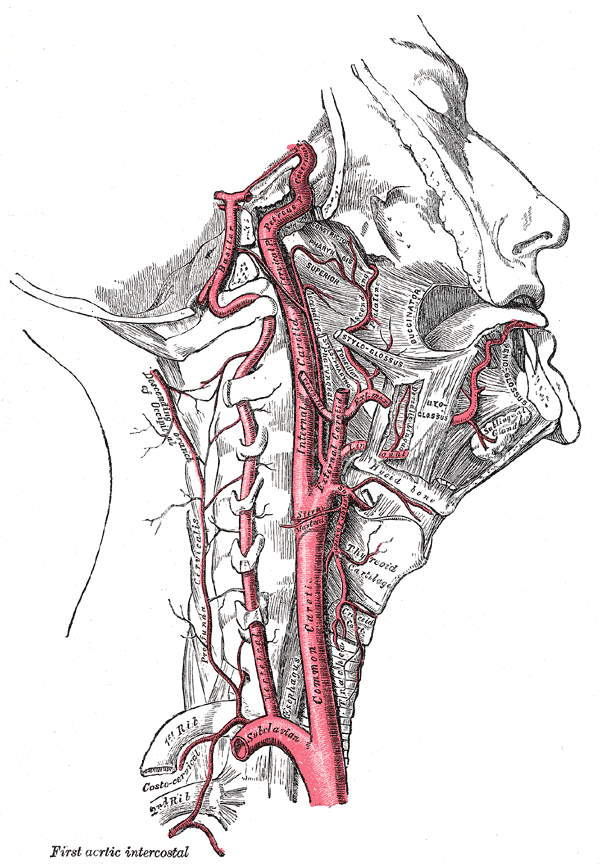
- Dissection in the carotid artery
- Specialty: Vascular surgery, Neurology
- Symptoms: Sudden, severe headache, neck or facial pain, vision changes, Horner's syndrome, stroke-like symptoms
- Complications: Stroke
- Causes: Spontaneous or traumatic (e.g., minor injuries, neck movement)
- Diagnostic method: Ultrasound, MRI, MRA, CTA
- Treatment: Anticoagulants, antiplatelet agents, Stenting, Angioplasty
- Frequency: Common cause of stroke in younger adults

Carotid artery dissection is a serious condition in which a tear forms in one of the two main carotid arteries in the neck, allowing blood to enter the artery wall and separate its layers (dissection). This separation can lead to the formation of a blood clot, narrowing of the artery, and restricted blood flow to the brain, potentially resulting in stroke. Symptoms vary depending on the extent and location of the dissection and may include a sudden, severe headache, neck or facial pain, vision changes, a drooping eyelid (Horner's syndrome), and stroke-like symptoms such as weakness or numbness on one side of the body, difficulty speaking, or loss of coordination.

Carotid artery dissection can occur spontaneously or be triggered by trauma, including minor injuries, certain medical conditions, or activities that involve neck movement. It is a leading cause of stroke in young and middle-aged adults. The condition is typically diagnosed through imaging studies, such as ultrasound, magnetic resonance imaging (MRI), magnetic resonance angiography (MRA), or computed tomography angiography (CTA), which help visualize the blood vessels and detect abnormalities.

Management of carotid artery dissection depends on the severity and symptoms. Treatment options often include medications like anticoagulants or antiplatelet agents to prevent blood clot formation and reduce the risk of stroke. In more severe cases, surgical or endovascular interventions, such as stenting or angioplasty, may be required to restore proper blood flow. Early detection and treatment are crucial for improving outcomes, though the prognosis can vary based on the extent of the dissection and the presence of complications.

== Description ==
Carotid artery dissection (or cervical artery dissection) is the separation of the layers within the wall of the carotid arteries, which supply oxygen-rich blood to the brain. It is a significant cause of stroke in younger adults.

The carotid arteries are major blood vessels in the neck that branch into smaller vessels called the external and internal carotid arteries. In carotid artery dissection, a tear in the arterial wall allows blood to flow between the layers of the artery, leading to potential narrowing, reduced blood flow, or clot formation, which may cause a stroke.

== Signs and symptoms ==
The signs and symptoms of carotid artery dissection may be divided into ischemic and non-ischemic categories:

Non-ischemic signs and symptoms:

- Neck pain and headache, sometimes escalating in intensity
- Decreased pupil size with drooping of the upper eyelid (Horner syndrome)
- Pulsatile tinnitus

Ischemic signs and symptoms:

- Temporary vision loss
- Ischemic stroke

== Causes ==
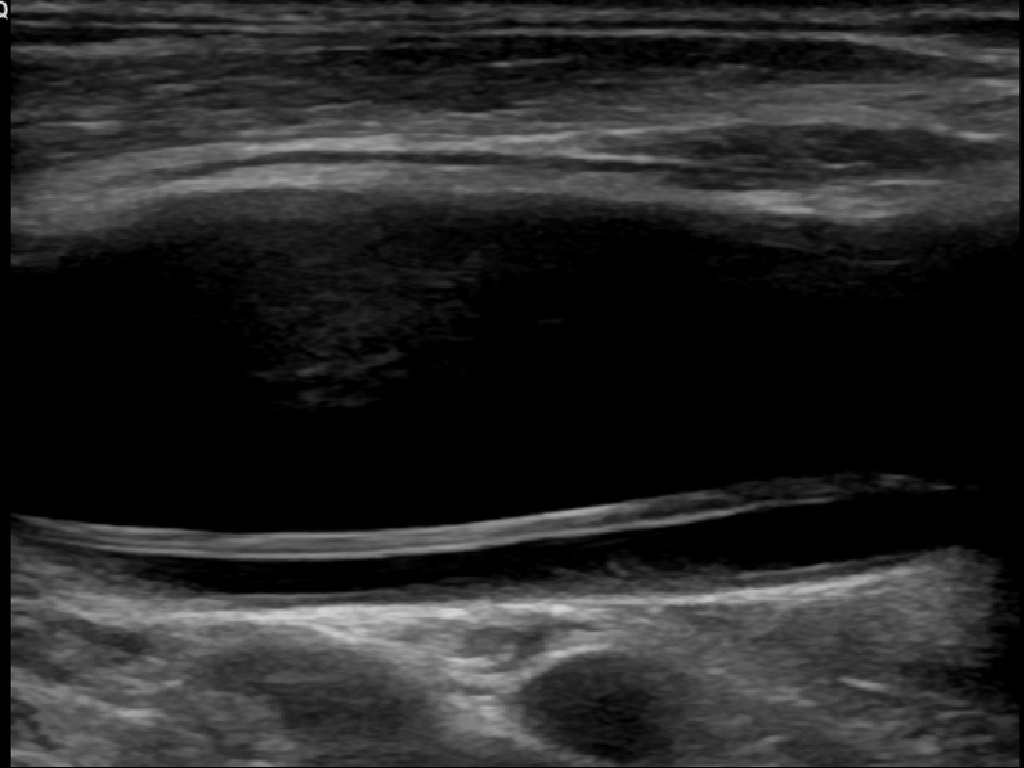
Dissection in ultrasound

The causes of carotid artery dissection can be broadly categorized into two classes: spontaneous or traumatic.

Dissection may occur after direct physical trauma, traffic collision, strangulation, or any phenomenon that causes hyperextension of the neck. They can also happen spontaneously.

=== Spontaneous ===
Once considered uncommon, spontaneous carotid artery dissection is an increasingly recognized cause of stroke that preferentially affects the middle-aged.

The incidence of spontaneous carotid artery dissection is low, and incidence rates for internal carotid artery dissection have been reported to be around 2.6 to 2.9 incidents per 100,000. Though the incidence is low, it is the cause of the vast majority of strokes in young people.

Observational studies and case reports published since the early 1980s show that patients with spontaneous internal carotid artery dissection may also have a history of stroke in their family and/or hereditary connective tissue disorders, such as Marfan syndrome, Ehlers–Danlos syndrome, autosomal dominant polycystic kidney disease, pseudoxanthoma elasticum, fibromuscular dysplasia, and osteogenesis imperfecta type I. IgG4-related disease involving the carotid artery has also been observed as a cause.

However, although an association with connective tissue disorders does exist, most people with spontaneous arterial dissections do not have associated connective tissue disorders. Also, the reports on the prevalence of hereditary connective tissue diseases in people with spontaneous dissections are highly variable, ranging from 0–0.6% in one study to 5–18% in another study.

There is increasing evidence that internal carotid artery dissection can also be associated with the styloid process (known as Eagle syndrome when the elongated styloid process causes symptoms).

=== Traumatic ===
Carotid artery dissection is thought to be more commonly caused by severe violent trauma to the head and/or neck. An estimated 0.67% of patients admitted to the hospital after major motor vehicle accidents were found to have blunt carotid injury, including intimal dissections, pseudoaneurysms, thromboses, or fistulas. Of these, 76% had intimal dissections, pseudoaneurysms, or a combination of the two. Sports-related activities such as surfing and jiu-jitsu have been reported as causes of carotid artery dissection.

The probable mechanism of injury for most internal carotid injuries is rapid deceleration, with resultant hyperextension and rotation of the neck, which stretches the internal carotid artery over the upper cervical vertebrae, producing an intimal tear. After such an injury, the patient may remain asymptomatic, have a hemispheric transient ischemic event, or have a stroke.

Artery dissection has also been reported in association with some forms of neck manipulation. There is significant controversy about the level of risk of stroke from neck manipulation. It may be that manipulation can cause dissection, or it may be that the dissection is already present in some people who seek manipulative treatment.

== Pathophysiology ==
Arterial dissection of the carotid arteries is a condition that arises when a small tear forms in the innermost lining of the arterial wall, known as the tunica intima. This tear allows blood to enter the space between the inner and outer layers of the vessel, leading to either narrowing (stenosis) or complete occlusion. Notably, the stenosis in the early stages of arterial dissection is a dynamic process, and some occlusions can quickly transition back to stenosis. When complete occlusion occurs, it can result in ischemia, a condition characterized by insufficient blood supply to a particular area.

In cases of complete occlusion, symptoms may not always be evident due to the presence of collateral circulation, which helps to adequately perfuse the brain. However, complications can arise when blood clots develop at the site of the tear and subsequently break off, forming emboli. These emboli can then travel through the arteries and reach the brain, where they may block the blood supply. This blockage leads to an ischemic stroke, also known as a cerebral infarction. It is believed that blood clots or emboli originating from the dissection are responsible for causing infarctions in the majority of cases involving strokes in the presence of carotid artery dissection.

Cerebral infarction, as a result of carotid artery dissection, can cause irreversible damage to the brain. Studies have demonstrated a significant number of patients with dissections go on to experience full blown strokes, often some time after the original dissection event. This emphasizes the serious and potentially life-altering consequences associated with this condition.

== Treatment ==
The goal of treatment is to prevent the development of an actual stroke or limit the continuation of neurologic deficits should a stroke occur after dissection. Treatments include observation, anti-platelet agents, anticoagulation, stent implantation, carotid endarterectomy, and carotid artery ligation.

== Epidemiology ==
Carotid dissections events can occur at any age. They tend to occur more often in younger individuals under 50. Such events are slightly more common in men than in women. Spontaneous internal carotid artery dissection is a rare event with an incidence rate of approximately 2.6 to 2.9 per 100,000 individuals. However, such events account for ~5% to ~22% of strokes in patients under the age of 45 years.

== See also ==
- Aortic dissection
- Vertebral artery dissection
