= Steal syndrome =

Steal syndrome may refer to:

- Cardiac steal syndrome
- Subclavian steal syndrome, often associated with fainting, and typically due to atherosclerosis
- Vascular access steal syndrome, a problem related to a surgically created vascular access (fistula) for hemodialysis

== See also ==
- Steele-Richardson-Olszewski syndrome, alternative name for progressive supranuclear palsy
