= Recurrent artery =

Recurrent artery may refer to

- Anterior tibial recurrent artery
- Anterior ulnar recurrent artery
- Interosseous recurrent artery
- Posterior tibial recurrent artery
- Posterior ulnar recurrent artery
- Radial recurrent artery
- Recurrent artery of Heubner
- Ulnar recurrent artery (disambiguation), various meanings
