= Ulnar collateral artery =

Ulnar collateral artery may refer to:

- Inferior ulnar collateral artery
- Superior ulnar collateral artery
