= Distal revascularization and interval ligation =

DRIL
- Specialty: Nephrology/vascular medicine

Distal Revascularization and Interval Ligation (DRIL) is a surgical procedure used to treat symptomatic Dialysis Access Steal Syndrome (DASS). The goal of this surgery is to alleviate the symptoms of DASS, such as pain and numbness in the extremity distal to the access, while preserving the access for hemodialysis. The surgeon creates a bypass around the access and ligates the artery just distal to the access anastomosis, thereby preventing retrograde blood flow from the affected limb. This operation is very effective at reducing symptoms, but it carries a risk associated with ligating a native artery.

== Medical Use ==
DASS refers to a complication of arteriovenous (AV) access creation characterized by ischemia distal to the AV formation. The AV access has much lower resistance compared to the arterial outflow supplying the distal extremity, which causes blood to be shunted away from the hand or foot and towards the access. It is more common with artificial grafts, as opposed to autologous fistulas, and in accesses created more proximally in the extremities (i.e., using the Brachial Artery). Symptoms include paleness, numbness, coolness, and pain in the distal extremities. Mild symptoms can be closely monitored, but more severe symptoms like extreme pain, loss of motor function, and tissue loss/gangrene require urgent treatment to prevent significant morbidity and limb loss.

Decreased pulses in the wrist/ankle and changes in the pulses or momentary improvement of symptoms with access compression are all suggestive of DASS. Before any surgical intervention, patients should undergo arterial duplex studies and vein mapping. Poor inflow proximal to the AV access can also cause steal symptoms; therefore, angiography should be performed to assess the inflow and identify any disease distal to the access.

== Procedure ==
The goal of the DRIL procedure is to resolve the steal symptoms while preserving AV access functionality. Usually, DRIL is performed in accesses utilizing the Brachial Artery. In summary, the procedure is performed by ligating the artery just distal to the AV access and creating a bypass to a distal artery around the ligation. DRIL works by preventing steal from the distal extremity to the access due to the ligation. Autologous vein is the preferred conduit of choice for the bypass, with the Great Saphenous, Cephalic, and Basilic being the most common. Prosthetics, such as ePTFE, can also be used as a conduit.

The procedure begins with two separate incisions to expose the desired artery proximal and distal to the AV access. Vessel loops are used to isolate the arteries and provide hemostatic control. The conduit is then prepared, and a tunnel is created under the skin for the bypass. After administering heparin, the proximal anastomosis of the bypass is made, the conduit is brought through the tunnel, and, after ensuring adequate blood flow through the conduit, the distal anastomosis is made. Importantly, the proximal anastomosis is made more than 6 cm proximal to the AV access to ensure anterograde flow through the bypass. The artery is ligated with suture between the AV access anastomosis and the distal bypass anastomosis. The two incisions are then closed.

== Risks and Postoperative Considerations ==
DRIL is highly effective in relieving symptoms of DASS while maintaining dialysis access, with success seen in over 80% of cases. However, the main drawback of this procedure is that, by ligating a native artery, the distal extremity becomes dependent on the created bypass for circulation. A serious complication, like thrombosis of the bypass, could create a severe reduction in perfusion and acute limb ischemia.

Immediately postoperatively, distal pulses should be checked to ensure adequate blood flow. Initial follow-up should be performed two weeks after surgery to examine the surgical sites and monitor symptoms. Assessment with duplex ultrasound should be performed at 1, 3, 6, and 12 months to ensure patency of the DRIL bypass.

== Alternative Options ==
Banding

- Involves placing a suture around the AV access to increase resistance and decrease flow
- Should be used in steal caused by high flow into the access

Revision Using Distal Inflow (RUDI)

- Involves ligating the AV access at the anastomosis and lengthening the access to a more distal artery via a conduit
- Also effective for high access flow rates

Proximalization of Arterial Inflow (PAI)

- Involves ligating the AV access at the anastomosis and attaching to a PTFE graft with a more proximal arterial anastomosis
- Used for low/normal access flow rates

Ligation of Access

- Used for emergent cases, such as severe limb ischemia, and in poor operative candidates
- Permanent, so patient will require new hemodialysis access

== History ==
DRIL was first proposed by Harry Schanzer and colleagues in 1988.
