= SFSR (disambiguation) =

SFSR may refer to:

- A Soviet Federative Socialist Republic or Socialist Federative Soviet Republic, any of several Republics of the Soviet Union:
  - Russian Soviet Federative Socialist Republic (Russian SFSR) (1917–1991)
  - Transcaucasian Socialist Federative Soviet Republic (Transcaucasian SFSR) (1922–1936)
- Santa Fe Southern Railway, a short line railroad in New Mexico, United States
- San Francisco Syncope Rule, a clinical prediction rule for syncopal episodes
