= Syncope (medicine) =

Transient loss of consciousness and postural tone

- Other names: Fainting, blacking out, passing out, swooning
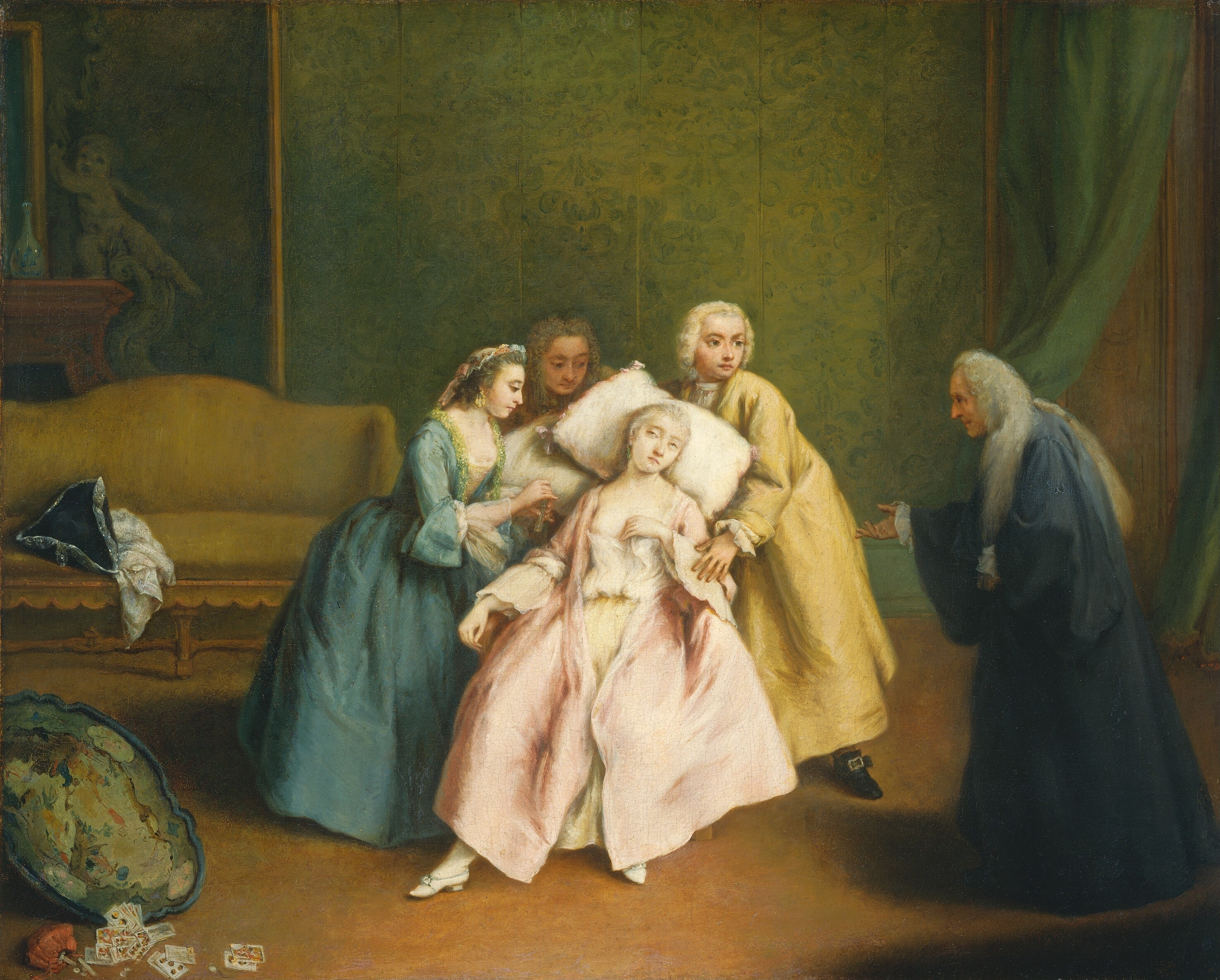
- A 1744 oil painting by Pietro Longhi called Fainting
- Specialty: Neurology, cardiology, emergency medicine
- Symptoms: Loss of consciousness and muscle strength
- Complications: Injury
- Usual onset: Fast onset
- Duration: Short duration
- Types: Cardiac, reflex, orthostatic hypotension
- Causes: Decrease in blood flow to brain
- Diagnostic method: Medical history, physical examination, electrocardiogram
- Treatment: Based on underlying cause
- Prognosis: Depends on the underlying cause
- Frequency: ~5 per 1,000 per year

Syncope (/ˈsɪŋkəpi/, SING-kə-pee), commonly known as fainting or passing out, is a loss of consciousness and muscle strength characterized by a fast onset, short duration, and spontaneous recovery. It is caused by a decrease in blood flow to the brain, typically from low blood pressure. There are sometimes symptoms before the loss of consciousness such as lightheadedness, sweating, pale skin, blurred vision, nausea, vomiting, or feeling warm. Syncope may also be associated with a short episode of muscle twitching. Psychiatric causes can also be determined when a patient experiences fear, anxiety, or panic; particularly before a stressful event, usually medical in nature. When consciousness and muscle strength are not completely lost, it is called presyncope. It is recommended that presyncope be treated the same as syncope.

Causes range from non-serious to potentially fatal. There are three broad categories of causes: heart or blood vessel related; reflex, also known as neurally mediated; and orthostatic hypotension. Issues with the heart and blood vessels are the cause in about 10% and typically the most serious, while neurally mediated is the most common. Heart-related causes may include an abnormal heart rhythm, problems with the heart valves or heart muscle, and blockages of blood vessels from a pulmonary embolism or aortic dissection, among others. Neurally mediated syncope occurs when blood vessels expand and heart rate decreases inappropriately. This may occur from either a triggering event such as exposure to blood, pain, strong feelings or a specific activity such as urination, vomiting, or coughing. Neurally mediated syncope may also occur when an area in the neck known as the carotid sinus is pressed. The third type of syncope is due to a drop in blood pressure when changing position, such as when standing up. This is often due to medications that a person is taking, but may also be related to dehydration, significant bleeding, or infection. There also seems to be a genetic component to syncope.

A medical history, physical examination, and electrocardiogram (ECG) are the most effective ways to determine the underlying cause. The ECG is useful to detect an abnormal heart rhythm, poor blood flow to the heart muscle and other electrical issues, such as long QT syndrome and Brugada syndrome. Heart related causes also often have little history of a prodrome. Low blood pressure and a fast heart rate after the event may indicate blood loss or dehydration, while low blood oxygen levels may be seen following the event in those with pulmonary embolism. More specific tests such as implantable loop recorders, tilt table testing or carotid sinus massage may be useful in uncertain cases. Computed tomography (CT) is generally not required unless specific concerns are present. Other causes of similar symptoms that should be considered include seizure, stroke, concussion, low blood oxygen, low blood sugar, drug intoxication and some psychiatric disorders among others. Treatment depends on the underlying cause. Those who are considered at high risk following investigation may be admitted to hospital for further monitoring of the heart.

Syncope affects approximately three to six out of every thousand people each year. It is more common in older people and females. It is the reason for one to three percent of visits to emergency departments and admissions to hospitals. Up to half of women over the age of 80 and a third of medical students describe at least one event at some point in their lives. Of those presenting with syncope to an emergency department, about 4% died in the next 30 days. The risk of a poor outcome, however, depends on the underlying cause.

== Etymology ==
The Late Latin term syncope is derived from the Ancient Greek συγκοπή (synkopē) that literally means a "cutting up," from σύν (sýn: "together", "thoroughly") and κόπτειν (kóptein: "striking", "cutting off"), and denotes the passing out of consciousness typically caused by insufficient blood flowing to the brain.

== Causes ==
Causes range from non-serious to potentially fatal. There are three broad categories of causes: heart or blood vessel related; reflex, also known as neurally mediated; and orthostatic hypotension. Issues with the heart and blood vessels are the cause in about 10% and typically the most serious, while neurally mediated is the most common.

There also seems to be a genetic component to syncope. A recent genetic study has identified the first risk locus for syncope and collapse. The lead genetic variant, residing at chromosome 2q31.1, is an intergenic variant approximately 250 kb downstream of the ZNF804A gene. The variant affected the expression of ZNF804A, making this gene the strongest driver of the association.

=== Neurally mediated syncope ===
Reflex syncope or neurally mediated syncope occurs when blood vessels expand and heart rate decreases inappropriately leading to poor blood flow to the brain. This may occur from either a triggering event such as exposure to blood, pain, or strong feelings, or from a specific activity such as urination, vomiting, or coughing.

==== Vasovagal syncope ====
Vasovagal (situational) syncope is one of the most common types, which may occur in response to any of a variety of triggers, such as scary, embarrassing or uneasy situations, during blood drawing, or moments of sudden, unusually high stress. There are many different syncope syndromes that all fall under the umbrella of vasovagal syncope related by the same central mechanism. First, the person is usually predisposed to decreased blood pressure by various environmental factors. A lower than expected blood volume, for instance, from taking a low-salt diet in the absence of any salt-retaining tendency, or heat causing vaso-dilation and worsening the effect of the relatively insufficient blood volume. The next stage is the adrenergic response. If there is underlying fear or anxiety (e.g., social circumstances), or acute fear (e.g., acute threat, needle phobia), the vaso-motor centre demands an increased pumping action by the heart (flight or fight response). This is set in motion via the adrenergic (sympathetic) outflow from the brain, but the heart is unable to meet requirements because of the low blood volume or decreased return. A feedback response to the medulla is triggered via the afferent vagus nerve. The high (ineffective) sympathetic activity is thereby modulated by vagal (parasympathetic) outflow, leading to excessive slowing of heart rate. The abnormality lies in this excessive vagal response, causing loss of blood flow to the brain. The tilt-table test typically evokes the attack. Avoiding what provokes the syncope and possibly greater salt intake is often all that is needed.

Associated symptoms may be felt in the minutes leading up to a vasovagal episode and are referred to as the prodrome. These consist of light-headedness, confusion, pallor, nausea, salivation, sweating, tachycardia, blurred vision, and a sudden urge to defecate, among other symptoms.

Vasovagal syncope can be considered in two forms:

- Isolated episodes of loss of consciousness, unheralded by any warning symptoms for more than a few moments. These tend to occur in the adolescent age group and may be associated with fasting, exercise, abdominal straining, or circumstances promoting vaso-dilation (e.g., heat, alcohol). The subject is invariably upright. The tilt-table test, if performed, is generally negative.
- Recurrent syncope with complex associated symptoms. This is neurally mediated syncope (NMS). It is associated with any of the following: preceding or succeeding sleepiness, preceding visual disturbance ("spots before the eyes"), sweating, lightheadedness. The subject is usually but not always upright. The tilt-table test, if performed, is generally positive. It is relatively uncommon.

Syncope has been linked with psychological triggers. This includes fainting in response to the sight or thought of blood, needles, pain, and other emotionally stressful situations. One theory in evolutionary psychology is that fainting at the sight of blood might have evolved as a form of playing dead which increased survival from attackers and might have slowed blood loss in a primitive environment. "Blood-injury phobia", as this is called, is experienced by about 15% of people. It is often possible to manage these symptoms with specific behavioral techniques.

Another evolutionary psychology view is that some forms of fainting are non-verbal signals that developed in response to increased inter-group aggression during the Paleolithic. A non-combatant who has fainted signals that they are not a threat. This would explain the association between fainting and stimuli such as bloodletting and injuries seen in blood-injection-injury type phobias such as needle phobia as well as the gender differences.

Much of this pathway was discovered in animal experiments by Bezold (Vienna) in the 1860s. In animals, it may represent a defense mechanism when confronted by danger ("playing possum"). A 2023 study identified neuropeptide Y receptor Y2 vagal sensory neurons (NPY2R VSNs) and the periventricular zone (PVZ) as a coordinated neural network participating in the cardioinhibitory Bezold–Jarisch reflex (BJR) regulating fainting and recovery.

==== Situational syncope ====
Syncope may be caused by specific behaviors, including coughing, urination, defecation, vomiting, swallowing (deglutition), and following exercise. Manisty et al. note: "Deglutition syncope is characterised by loss of consciousness on swallowing; it has been associated not only with ingestion of solid food, but also with carbonated and ice-cold beverages, and even belching." Fainting can occur in "cough syncope" following severe fits of coughing, such as that associated with pertussis or "whooping cough". Neurally mediated syncope may also occur when an area in the neck known as the carotid sinus is pressed. A normal response to carotid sinus massage is a reduction in blood pressure and slowing of the heart rate. Especially in people with hypersensitive carotid sinus syndrome, this response can cause syncope or presyncope.

=== Cardiac ===
Heart-related causes may include an abnormal heart rhythm, problems with the heart valves or heart muscle, or blockages of blood vessels from a pulmonary embolism or aortic dissection, among others.

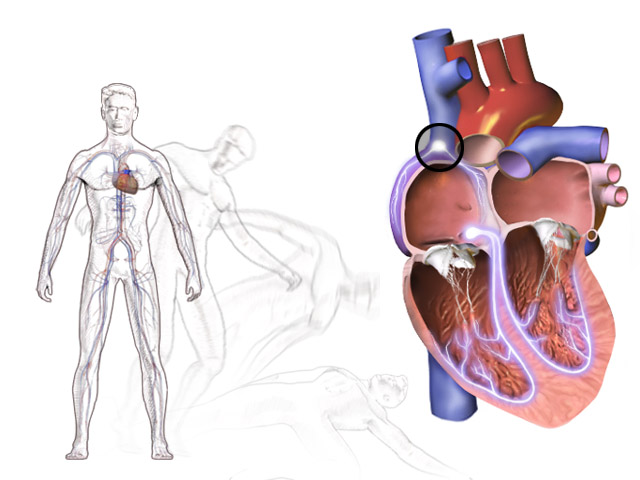
Syncope from bradycardia

==== Cardiac arrhythmias ====
The most common cause of cardiac syncope is cardiac arrhythmia (abnormal heart rhythm) wherein the heart beats too slowly, too rapidly, or too irregularly to pump enough blood to the brain. Some arrhythmias can be life-threatening.

Two major groups of arrhythmias are bradycardia and tachycardia. Bradycardia can be caused by heart blocks. Tachycardias include SVT (supraventricular tachycardia) and VT (ventricular tachycardia). SVT does not cause syncope except in Wolff-Parkinson-White syndrome. Ventricular tachycardia originates in the ventricles. VT causes syncope and can result in sudden death. Ventricular tachycardia, which describes a heart rate of over 100 beats per minute with at least three irregular heartbeats as a sequence of consecutive premature beats, can degenerate into ventricular fibrillation, which is rapidly fatal without cardiopulmonary resuscitation (CPR) and defibrillation.

Long QT syndrome can cause syncope when it sets off ventricular tachycardia or torsades de pointes. The degree of QT prolongation determines the risk of syncope. Brugada syndrome also commonly presents with syncope secondary to arrhythmia.

Typically, tachycardic-generated syncope is caused by a cessation of beats following a tachycardic episode. This condition, called tachycardia-bradycardia syndrome, is usually caused by sinoatrial node dysfunction or block or atrioventricular block.

==== Obstructive cardiac lesion ====
Blockages in major vessels or within the heart can also impede blood flow to the brain. Aortic stenosis and mitral stenosis are the most common examples. The major valves of the heart become stiff and reduce the efficiency of the heart's pumping action. This may not cause symptoms at rest, but with exertion, the heart is unable to keep up with increased demands, leading to syncope. Aortic stenosis presents with repeated episodes of syncope. Rarely, cardiac tumors such as atrial myxomas can also lead to syncope.

==== Structural cardiopulmonary disease ====
Diseases involving the shape and strength of the heart can cause reduced blood flow to the brain, which increases the risk for syncope. The most common cause in this category is fainting associated with an acute myocardial infarction or ischemic event. The faint in this case is primarily caused by an abnormal nervous system reaction similar to the reflex faints. Women are significantly more likely to experience syncope as a presenting symptom of a myocardial infarction. In general, faints caused by structural disease of the heart or blood vessels are particularly important to recognize, as they are warning of potentially life-threatening conditions.

Among other conditions prone to trigger syncope (by either hemodynamic compromise or by a neural reflex mechanism, or both), some of the most important are hypertrophic cardiomyopathy, acute aortic dissection, pericardial tamponade, pulmonary embolism, aortic stenosis, and pulmonary hypertension.

==== Other cardiac causes ====
Sick sinus syndrome, a sinus node dysfunction, causing alternating slow and fast heart rates. Often, there is a long pause (asystole) between heartbeats.

Adams-Stokes syndrome is a cardiac syncope that occurs with seizures caused by complete or incomplete heart block. Signs and symptoms include deep and fast breathing, weak and slow pulse, and respiratory pauses that can last up to 60 seconds.

Subclavian steal syndrome arises from retrograde (reversed) flow of blood in the vertebral artery or the internal thoracic artery, due to a proximal stenosis (narrowing) and/or occlusion of the subclavian artery. Symptoms such as syncope, lightheadedness, and paresthesias occur while exercising the arm on the affected side (most commonly the left).

Aortic dissection (a tear in the aorta) and cardiomyopathy can also result in syncope.

Various medications, such as beta blockers, may cause bradycardia induced syncope.

A pulmonary embolism can cause obstructed blood vessels and is the cause of syncope in less than 1% of people who present to the emergency department.

=== Blood pressure ===
Orthostatic (postural) hypotensive syncope is caused primarily by an excessive drop in blood pressure when standing up from a previous position of lying or sitting down. When the head is elevated above the feet, the pull of gravity causes blood pressure in the head to drop. This is sensed by stretch receptors in the walls of vessels in the carotid sinus and aortic arch. These receptors then trigger a sympathetic nervous response to compensate and redistribute blood back into the brain. The sympathetic nervous system response triggers peripheral vasoconstriction and quickens the increased heart rate. These together act to raise blood pressure back to baseline. Healthy individuals may experience minor symptoms ("lightheadedness", "greying-out") as they stand up if blood pressure is slow to respond to the stress of upright posture. If the blood pressure is not adequately maintained during standing, fainting may develop. However, the resulting "transient orthostatic hypotension" does not necessarily signal any serious underlying disease. It is as common or perhaps even more common than vasovagal syncope.

This may be due to medications, dehydration, significant bleeding, or infection. The most susceptible individuals are elderly, frail individuals, or persons who are dehydrated from hot environments or inadequate fluid intake. For example, medical students would be at risk for orthostatic hypotensive syncope while observing long surgeries in the operating room. There is also evidence that exercise training can help reduce orthostatic intolerance. More serious orthostatic hypotension is often the result of certain commonly prescribed medications such as diuretics, β-adrenergic blockers, other anti-hypertensives (including vasodilators), and nitroglycerin. In a small percentage of cases, the cause of orthostatic hypotensive faints is structural damage to the autonomic nervous system due to systemic diseases (e.g., amyloidosis or diabetes) or in neurological diseases (e.g., Parkinson's disease).

Hyperadrenergic orthostatic hypotension refers to an orthostatic drop in blood pressure despite high levels of sympathetic adrenergic response. This occurs when a person with normal physiology is unable to compensate for >20% loss in intravascular volume. This may be due to blood loss, dehydration or third-spacing. On standing, the person will experience reflex tachycardia (at least 20% higher than supine) and a drop in blood pressure.

Hypoadrenergic orthostatic hypotension occurs when the person is unable to sustain a normal sympathetic response to blood pressure changes during movement despite adequate intravascular volume. There is little to no compensatory increase in heart rate or blood pressure when standing for up to 10 minutes. This is often due to an underlying disorder or medication use and is accompanied by other hypoadrenergic signs.

=== Central nervous system ischemia ===
The central ischemic response is triggered by an inadequate supply of oxygenated blood in the brain. Common examples include strokes and transient ischemic attacks. While these conditions often impair consciousness, they rarely meet the medical definition of syncope. Vertebrobasilar transient ischemic attacks may produce true syncope as a symptom.

The respiratory system may compensate for dropping oxygen levels through hyperventilation, though a sudden ischemic episode may also proceed faster than the respiratory system can respond. These processes cause the typical symptoms of fainting: pale skin, rapid breathing, nausea, and weakness of the limbs, particularly of the legs. If the ischemia is intense or prolonged, limb weakness progresses to collapse. The weakness of the legs causes most people to sit or lie down if there is time to do so. This may avert a complete collapse, but whether the patient sits down or falls, the result of an ischemic episode is a posture in which less blood pressure is required to achieve adequate blood flow. An individual with very little skin pigmentation may appear to have all color drained from his or her face at the onset of an episode. This effect, combined with the following collapse, can make a strong and dramatic impression on bystanders.

==== Vertebro-basilar arterial disease ====
Arterial disease in the upper spinal cord or lower brain that causes syncope if there is a reduction in blood supply. This may occur with extending the neck or with the use of medications to lower blood pressure.

=== Other causes ===
Seizures and syncope can be difficult to differentiate. Both often present as a sudden loss of consciousness, and convulsive movements may be present or absent in either. Movements in syncope are typically brief and more irregular than seizures. Akinetic seizures can present with sudden loss of postural tone without associated tonic-clonic movements. Absence of a long post-ictal state is indicative of syncope rather than an akinetic seizure. Some rare forms, such as hair-grooming syncope, are of an unknown cause.

Subarachnoid hemorrhage may result in syncope. Often this occurs with a sudden, severe headache. It may occur as a result of a ruptured aneurysm or head trauma.

Heat syncope occurs when heat exposure causes decreased blood volume and peripheral vasodilatation. Position changes, especially during vigorous exercise in the heat, may lead to decreased blood flow to the brain. Closely related to other causes of syncope related to hypotension (low blood pressure), such as orthostatic syncope.

Some psychological conditions (anxiety disorder, somatic symptom disorder, conversion disorder) may cause symptoms resembling syncope. Several psychological interventions are available.

Low blood sugar can be a rare cause of syncope.

Narcolepsy may present with sudden loss of consciousness similar to syncope.

== Diagnostic approach ==
A medical history, physical examination, and electrocardiogram (ECG) are the most effective ways to determine the underlying cause of syncope. Guidelines from the American College of Emergency Physicians and American Heart Association recommend a syncope workup include a thorough medical history, physical exam with orthostatic vitals, and a 12-lead ECG. The ECG is useful to detect an abnormal heart rhythm, poor blood flow to the heart muscle and other electrical issues, such as long QT syndrome and Brugada syndrome. Heart related causes also often have little history of a prodrome. Low blood pressure and a fast heart rate after the event may indicate blood loss or dehydration, while low blood oxygen levels may be seen following the event in those with pulmonary embolism. Routine broad panel laboratory testing detects abnormalities in <2–3% of results and is therefore not recommended.

Based on this initial workup many physicians will tailor testing and determine whether a person qualifies as 'high-risk', 'intermediate risk' or 'low-risk' based on risk stratification tools. More specific tests such as implantable loop recorders, tilt table testing or carotid sinus massage may be useful in uncertain cases. Computed tomography (CT) is generally not required unless specific concerns are present. Other causes of similar symptoms that should be considered include seizure, stroke, concussion, low blood oxygen, low blood sugar, drug intoxication and some psychiatric disorders among others. Treatment depends on the underlying cause. Those who are considered at high risk following investigation may be admitted to hospital for further monitoring of the heart.

A hemoglobin count may indicate anemia or blood loss. However, this has been useful in only about 5% of people evaluated for fainting. The tilt table test is performed to elicit orthostatic syncope secondary to autonomic dysfunction (neurogenic). Several factors make a heart-related cause more likely, including age over 35, a history of atrial fibrillation, and turning blue during the event.

=== Electrocardiogram ===
Electrocardiogram (ECG) finds that should be looked for include signs of heart ischemia, arrhythmias, atrioventricular blocks, a long QT, a short PR, Brugada syndrome, signs of hypertrophic obstructive cardiomyopathy (HOCM), and signs of arrhythmogenic right ventricular dysplasia (ARVD/C). Signs of HCM include large voltages in the precordial leads, repolarization abnormalities, and a wide QRS with a slurred upstroke. Signs of ARVD/C include T wave inversion and epsilon waves in lead V1 to V3.

It is estimated that 20-50% of people have an abnormal ECG. However, while an ECG may identify conditions such as atrial fibrillation, heart block, or a new or old heart attack, it typically does not provide a definite diagnosis for the underlying cause of fainting. Sometimes, a Holter monitor may be used. This is a portable ECG device that can record the wearer's heart rhythms during daily activities over an extended period of time. Since fainting usually does not occur upon command, a Holter monitor can provide a better understanding of the heart's activity during fainting episodes. For people with more than two episodes of syncope and no diagnosis on "routine testing", an insertable cardiac monitor might be used. It lasts 28–36 months and is inserted just beneath the skin in the upper chest area.

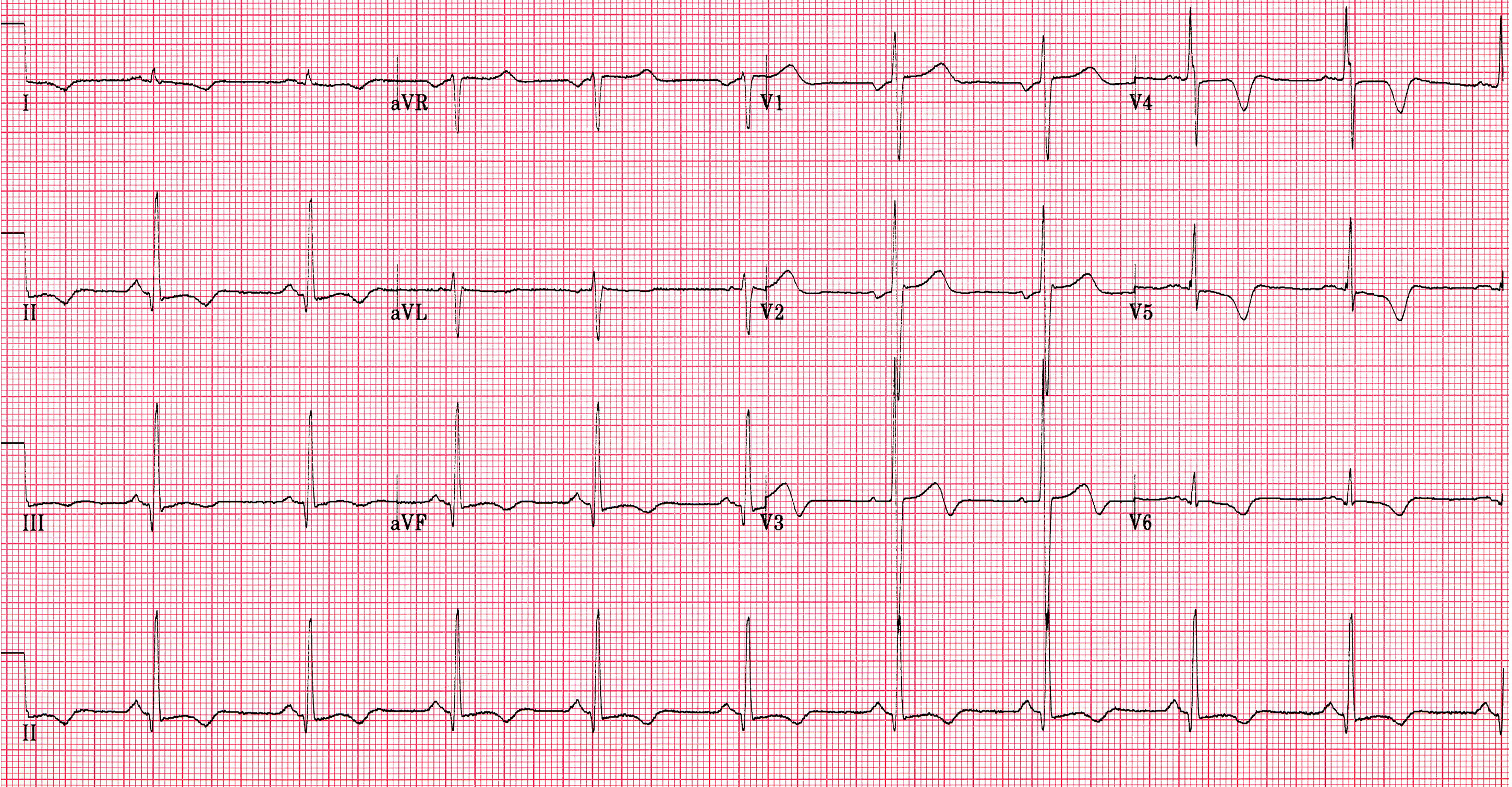
ECG showing HOCM

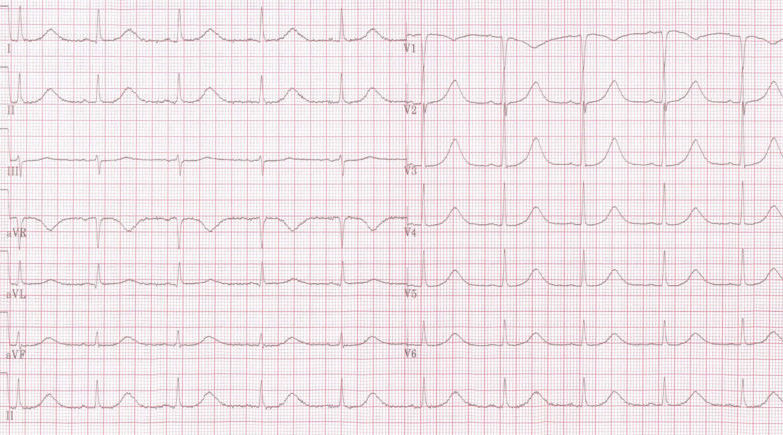
Long QT syndrome

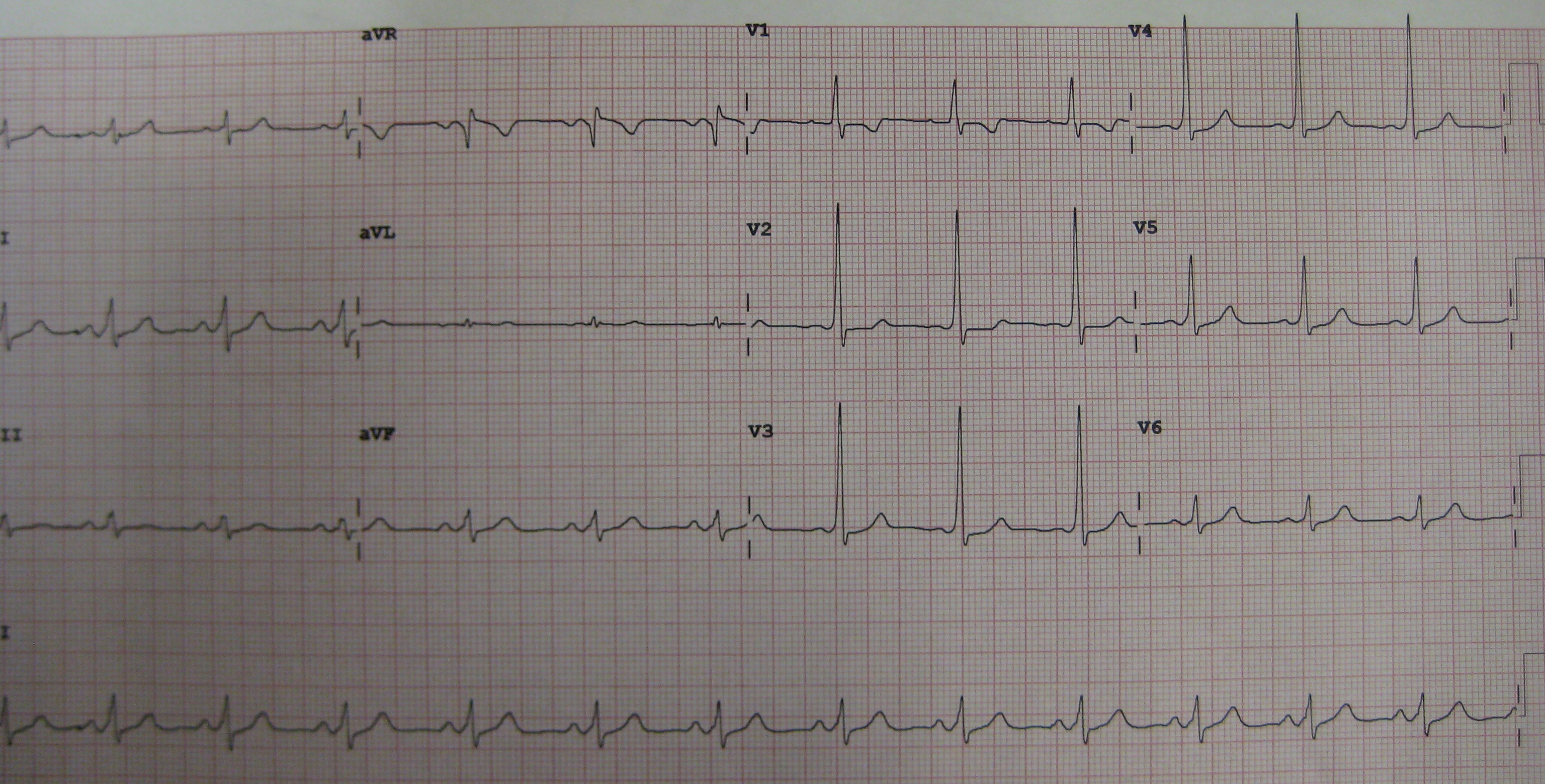
A short PR in Wolff–Parkinson–White syndrome

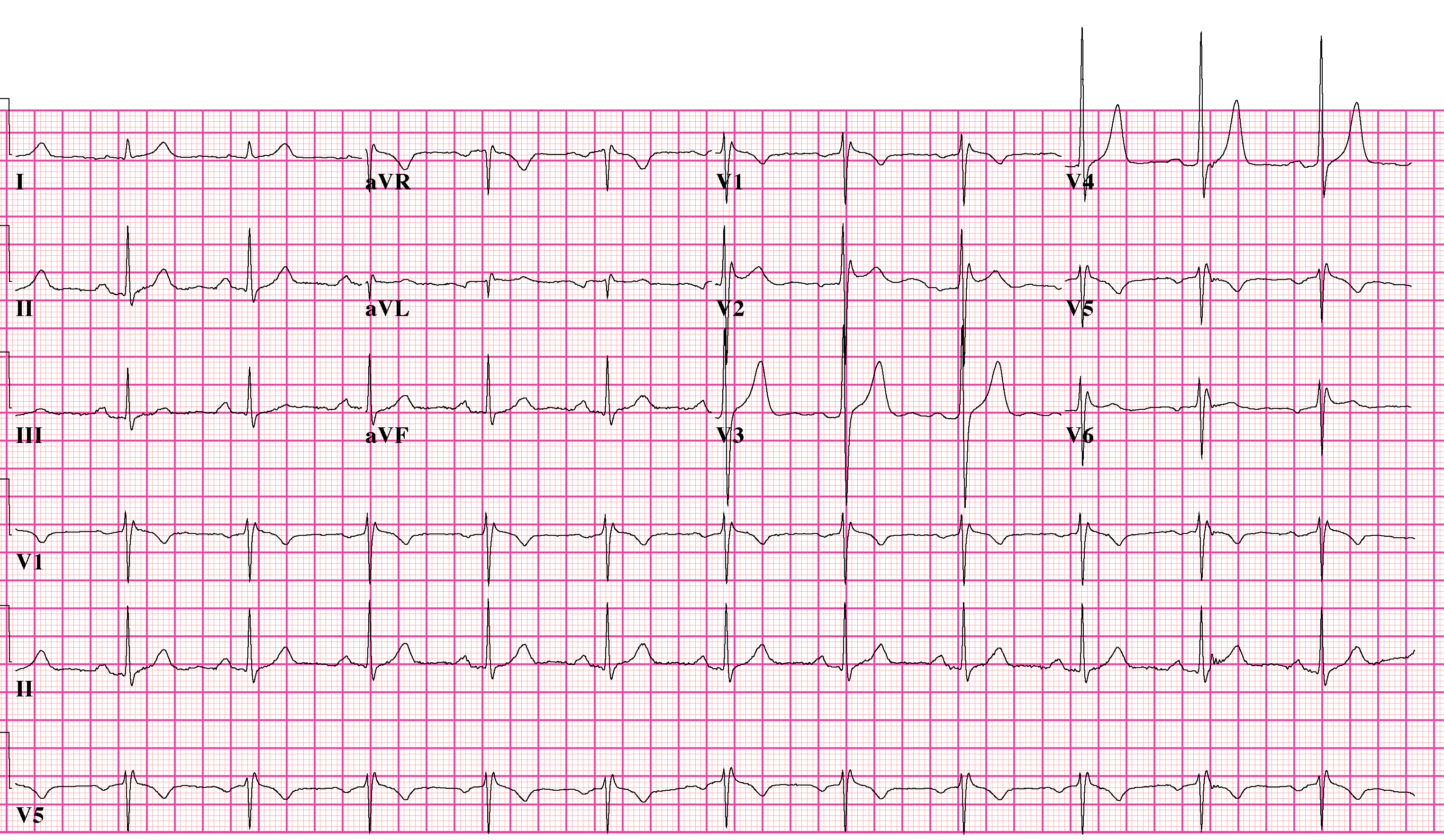
Type 2 Brugada ECG pattern

=== Imaging ===
Echocardiography and ischemia testing may be recommended for cases where initial evaluation and ECG testing is nondiagnostic. For people with uncomplicated syncope (without seizures and a normal neurological exam) computed tomography or MRI is not generally needed. Likewise, using carotid ultrasonography on the premise of identifying carotid artery disease as a cause of syncope also is not indicated. Although sometimes investigated as a cause of syncope, carotid artery problems are unlikely to cause that condition. Additionally an electroencephalogram (EEG) is generally not recommended. A bedside ultrasound may be performed to rule out abdominal aortic aneurysm in people with concerning history or presentation.

=== Differential diagnosis ===
Other diseases which mimic syncope include seizure, low blood sugar, certain types of stroke, and paroxysmal spells. While these may appear as "fainting", they do not fit the strict definition of syncope being a sudden reversible loss of consciousness due to decreased blood flow to the brain.

== Management ==
Management of syncope focuses on treating the underlying cause. This can be challenging as the underlying cause is unclear in half of all cases. Several risk stratification tools (explained below) have been developed to combat the vague nature of this diagnosis. People with an abnormal ECG reading, history of congestive heart failure, family history of sudden cardiac death, shortness of breath, HCT<30, hypotension, or evidence of bleeding should be admitted to the hospital for further evaluation and monitoring. Low-risk cases of vasovagal or orthostatic syncope in younger people with no significant cardiac history, no family history of sudden unexplained death, and a normal EKG and initial evaluation may be candidates for discharge to follow-up with their primary care provider.

Recommended acute treatment of vasovagal and orthostatic (hypotension) syncope involves returning blood to the brain by positioning the person on the ground, with legs slightly elevated or sitting leaning forward and the head between the knees for at least 10–15 minutes, preferably in a cool and quiet place. For individuals who have problems with chronic fainting spells, therapy should focus on recognizing the triggers and learning techniques to keep from fainting. At the appearance of warning signs such as lightheadedness, nausea, or cold and clammy skin, counter-pressure maneuvers that involve gripping fingers into a fist, tensing the arms, and crossing the legs or squeezing the thighs together can be used to ward off a fainting spell. After the symptoms have passed, sleep is recommended. Lifestyle modifications are essential for treating people experiencing repeated syncopal episodes. Avoiding triggers and situations where loss of consciousness would be seriously hazardous (operating heavy machinery, commercial pilot, etc.) is effective.

If fainting spells occur often without a triggering event, syncope may be a sign of an underlying heart disease. In cases where syncope is caused by cardiac disease, the treatment is much more sophisticated than that of vasovagal syncope and may involve pacemakers and implantable cardioverter-defibrillators depending on the precise cardiac cause.

=== Risk tools ===
The San Francisco syncope rule was developed to isolate people who have a higher risk for a serious cause of syncope. High risk is anyone who has: congestive heart failure, hematocrit <30%, electrocardiograph abnormality, shortness of breath, or systolic blood pressure <90 mmHg. The San Francisco syncope rule, however, was not validated by subsequent studies.

The Canadian syncope risk score was developed to help select low-risk people that may be viable for discharge home. A score of <0 on the Canadian syncope risk score is associated with <2% risk of serious adverse event within 30 days. It is more effective than older syncope risk scores even combined with cardiac biomarkers at predicting adverse events.

== Epidemiology ==
There are 18.1–39.7 syncope episodes per 1000 people in the general population. Rates are highest between the ages of 10–30 years old. This is likely because of the high rates of vasovagal syncope in the young adult population. Older adults are more likely to have orthostatic or cardiac syncope.

Syncope affects approximately three to six out of every thousand people each year. It is more common in older people and females. It is the reason for 2–5% of visits to emergency departments and admissions to hospitals. Up to half of women over the age of 80 and a third of medical students describe at least one event at some point in their lives.

== Prognosis ==
Of those presenting with syncope to an emergency department, about 4% died in the next 30 days. The risk of a poor outcome, however, depends very much on the underlying cause. Situational syncope is not at increased risk of death or adverse outcomes. Cardiac syncope is associated with a worse prognosis compared to noncardiac syncope. Factors associated with poor outcomes include history of heart failure, history of myocardial infarction, ECG abnormalities, palpitations, signs of hemorrhage, syncope during exertion, and advanced age.

== Society and culture ==
Fainting in women was a commonplace trope or stereotype in Victorian England and in contemporary and modern depictions of the period.

Syncope and presyncope are common in young athletes. In 1990, the American college basketball player Hank Gathers suddenly collapsed and died during a televised intercollegiate basketball game. He had previously collapsed during a game a few months prior. He was diagnosed with exercise-induced ventricular tachycardia at the time. There was speculation that he had since stopped taking the prescribed medications on game days.

Falling-out is a culture-bound syndrome primarily reported in the southern United States and the Caribbean.

== See also ==
- Voodoo death
