= Subclavian steal syndrome =

- Other names: Subclavian steal phenomenon or Subclavian steal steno-occlusive disease
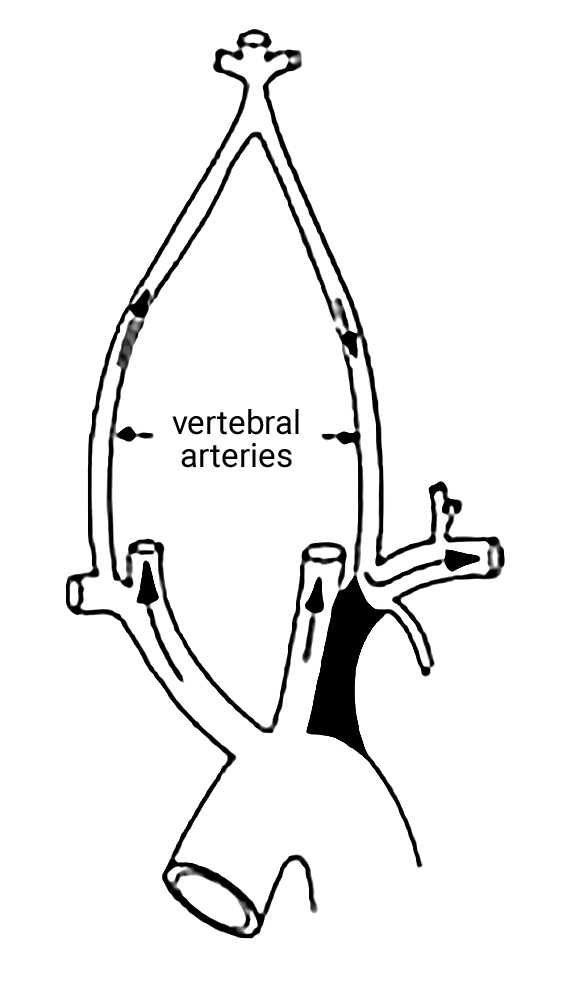
- The proximal part of left subclavian is blocked (shaded artery). This prevents antegrade ("forward") flow to the left arm and left vertebral. As a result, flow in the left vertebral is retrograde ("backwards") towards the left arm. Flow to the brain and circle of Willis is via antegrade right and left carotid and right vertebral arteries.
- Specialty: Neurology

Subclavian steal syndrome (SSS), also called subclavian steal steno-occlusive disease, is a constellation of signs and symptoms that arise from retrograde (reversed) blood flow in the vertebral artery or the internal thoracic artery, due to a proximal stenosis (narrowing) and/or occlusion of the subclavian artery. This flow reversal is called the subclavian steal or subclavian steal phenomenon, regardless of signs/symptoms being present. The arm may be supplied by blood flowing in a retrograde direction down the vertebral artery at the expense of the vertebrobasilar circulation. It is more severe than typical vertebrobasilar insufficiency.

== Signs and symptoms ==
- Presyncope (the sensation that one is about to faint)
- Syncope (fainting)
- Neurological deficits, including severe memory problems
- A blood pressure differential between the arms
- Blood circulation problems in the hands, manifesting as blotchy patches of red and white (associated with other signs of vascular disease, such as ulcers in the fingers)

== Causes ==
There are multiple processes that can cause obstruction of the subclavian artery before the vertebral artery, giving opportunity for SSS.

Atherosclerosis is the most common cause of SSS; all atherosclerotic risk factors are risk factors for SSS.

Thoracic outlet syndrome (TOS) increases the risk for SSS. TOS doesn't directly cause SSS, because the site of subclavian artery compression is over the first rib, which is distal to the vertebral artery. TOS has been reported to cause stroke through theorized clot propagation towards the vertebral artery; a similar mechanism could explain how TOS causes SSS. Presence of a cervical rib is a risk factor for both TOS and SSS.

Takayasu's arteritis is a disease causing inflammation of arteries, including the subclavian artery. Inflammation leaves behind dense scar tissue, which can become stenotic and restrict blood flow.

SSS can be iatrogenic, meaning a complication or side effect of medical treatment, one example being the obstructive fibrosis or thrombosis resulting from repair of aortic coarctation. Another example is Blalock–Taussig anastomosis for treatment of tetralogy of Fallot. The procedure involves dividing the subclavian artery and reconnecting the proximal portion to the pulmonary arteries, leaving the vertebral artery as the primary supply to the distal subclavian artery.

Various congenital vascular malformations cause SSS, examples including aortic coarctation and interrupted aortic arch.

== Pathophysiology ==
Classically, SSS is a consequence of a redundancy in the circulation of the brain and the flow of blood.

SSS results when the short low resistance path (along the subclavian artery) becomes a high resistance path (due to narrowing) and blood flows around the narrowing via the arteries that supply the brain (left and right vertebral artery, left and right internal carotid artery). The blood flow from the brain to the upper limb in SSS is considered to be stolen as it is blood flow the brain must do without. This is because of collateral vessels.

As in vertebral-subclavian steal, coronary-subclavian steal may occur in patients who have received a coronary artery bypass graft using the internal thoracic artery (ITA), also known as internal mammary artery. As a result of this procedure, the distal end of the ITA is diverted to one of the coronary arteries (typically the LAD), facilitating blood supply to the heart. In the setting of increased resistance in the proximal subclavian artery, blood may flow backward away from the heart along the ITA, causing myocardial ischemia due to coronary steal. Vertebral-subclavian and coronary-subclavian steal can occur concurrently in patients with an ITA CABG.

=== Hemodynamics ===
Blood, like electric current, flows along the path of least resistance. Resistance is affected by the length and width of a vessel (i.e. a long, narrow vessel has the greatest resistance and a short, wide one the least), but crucially, in the human body, width is generally more limiting than length because of Poiseuille's Law. Thus, if blood is presented with two paths, a short one that is narrow (with a high overall resistance) and a long one that is wide (with a low overall resistance), it will take the long and wide path (the one with the lower resistance).

=== Vascular anatomy ===
The blood vessels supplying the brain arise from the vertebral arteries and internal carotid arteries and are connected to one another by communicating vessels that form a circle (known as the circle of Willis).

=== Blood flow ===
Normally, blood flows from the aorta into the subclavian artery, and then some of that blood leaves via the vertebral artery to supply the brain.

In SSS a reduced quantity of blood flows through the proximal subclavian artery. As a result, blood travels up one of the other blood vessels to the brain (the other vertebral or the carotids), reaches the basilar artery or goes around the cerebral arterial circle and descends via the (contralateral) vertebral artery to the subclavian (with the proximal blockage) and feeds blood to the distal subclavian artery (which supplies the upper limb and shoulder).

== Diagnosis ==
The evaluation for this condition includes:

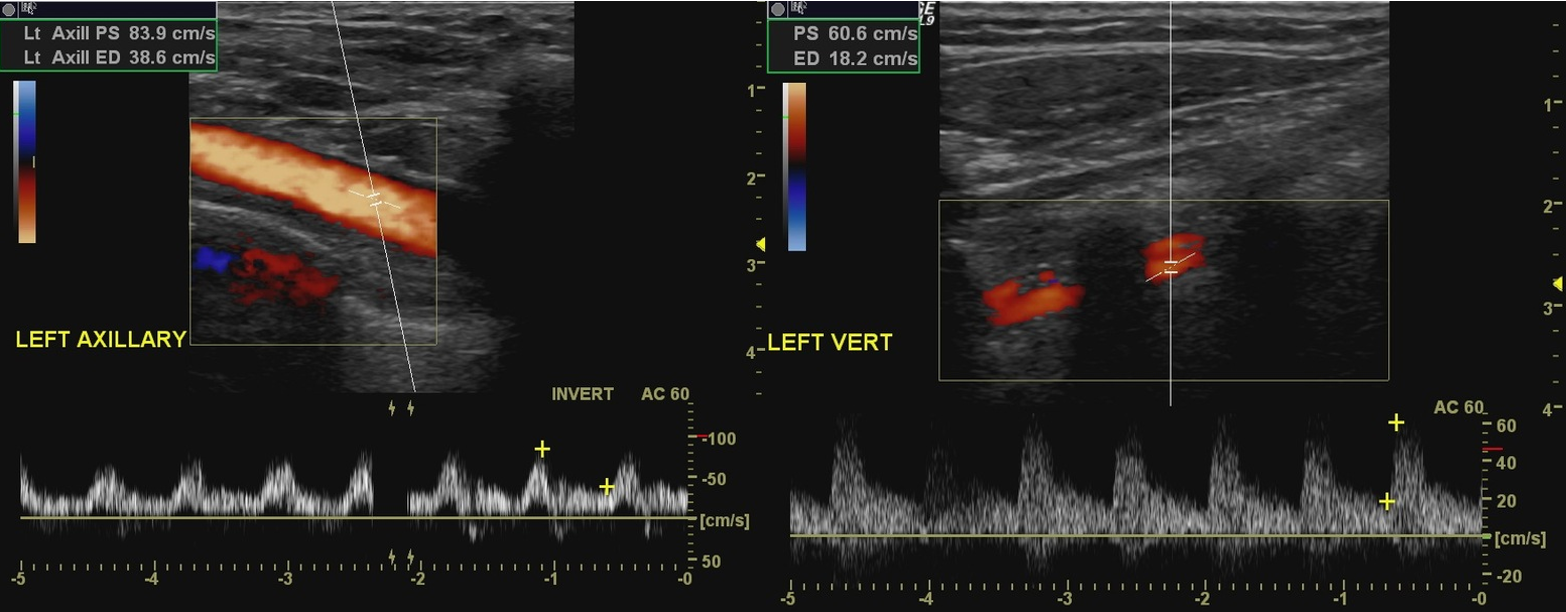
Doppler ultrasound of subclavian steal phenomenon

- Doppler ultrasound
- CT angiography

=== Differential diagnosis ===
- Stroke

== Treatment ==
Management for this condition includes:

- Carotid subclavian bypass
- Stent and balloon angioplasty
- Endarterectomy

== Additional images ==
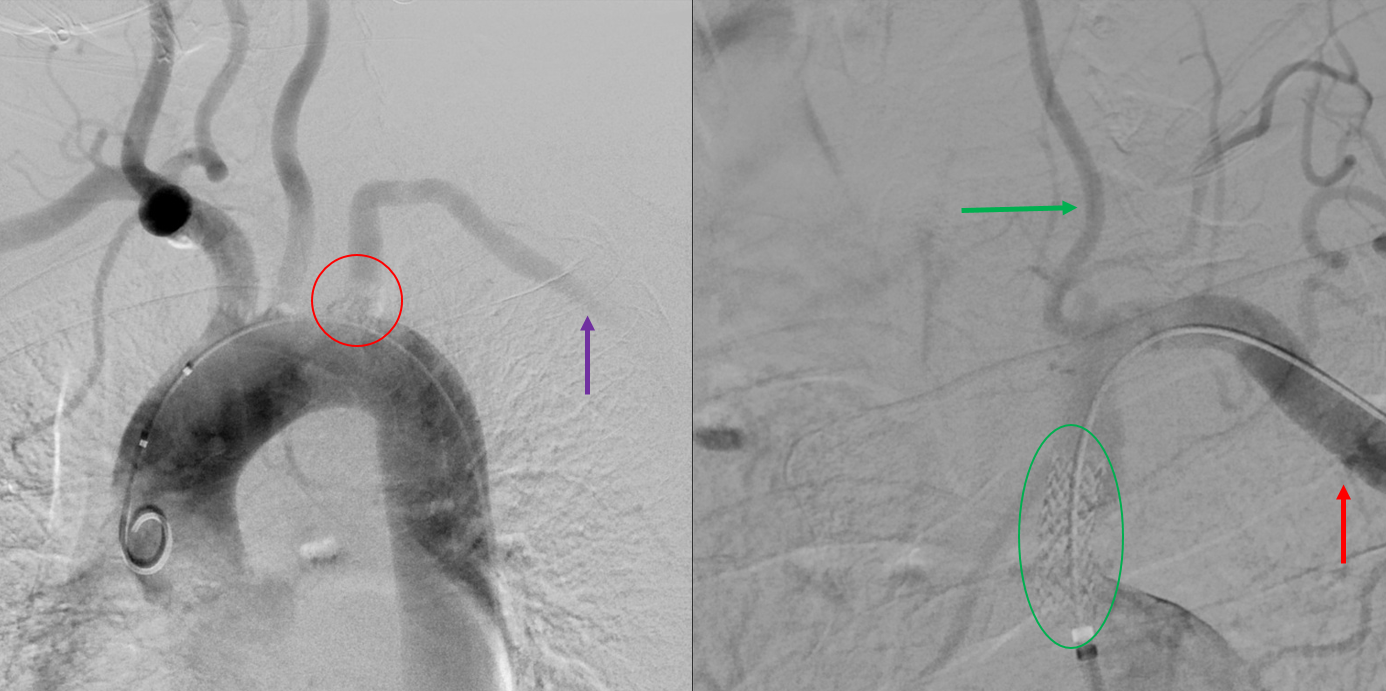
Angiogram of subclavian steal phenomenon before and after stent placement

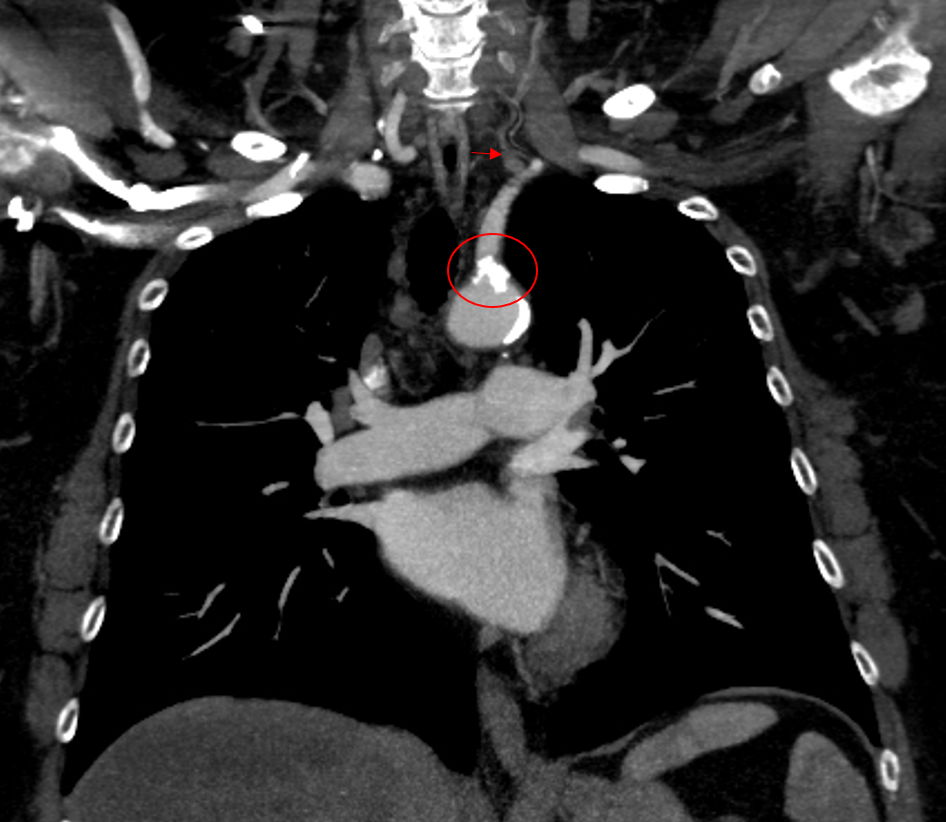
CT angiography of subclavian steal phenomenon

== See also ==
- Vascular access steal syndrome
- Peripheral artery disease
