= Ischemic monomelic neuropathy =

- Other names: IMN
- Specialty: Cardiology/neurology

Ischemic monomelic neuropathy (IMN) is an uncommon vascular access complication in hemodialysis patients that manifests as multiple mononeuropathies without clinical ischemia. Ischemic monomelic neuropathy is most likely to affect patients who have had brachiocephalic vascular grafts, and it is characterized by symptoms of acute pain, numbness, and paresthesia in addition to motor weakness. The term "ischemic monomelic neuropathy" was first used in 1983 by Wilbourn, despite the fact that Bolton et al. had originally reported on it in 1979.

== Signs and symptoms ==
Neurologic symptoms predominate and typically appear right away, even in the absence of a substantial clinical ischemia of the hand. All three of the forearm nerves can cause pain, paresthesias, numbness, and diffuse motor weakness or paralysis as symptoms. These deficiencies are frequently more pronounced distally and less severe proximally. In addition to frequently having a palpable radial pulse or audible Doppler signal, the hand is typically warm.

== Causes ==
Ischemic monomelic neuropathy is a complication of arteriovenous fistula access for hemodialysis.

Patients with diabetes and women are more likely to experience ischemic monomelic neuropathy.

== Mechanism ==
The precise workings of IMN remain largely unknown. Since the access surgery "steals" blood flow from distal nerve tissue, multiple axonal loss mononeuropathies are caused distally in the limb, IMN is a type of steal phenomenon.

== Diagnosis ==
This illness is diagnosed clinically. It should be connected to peripheral artery disease and peripheral neuropathy with underlying artery manipulation. Electro-diagnostic studies can help with diagnosis when the results of the clinical neurologic examination are unclear. The diagnosis can be verified with nerve conduction studies and electromyography. Axonal loss, low amplitude or absent responses to sensory and motor nerve stimulation, and comparatively preserved conduction velocities are commonly observed in the electromyogram.

Vascular steal, neurologic consequences of axillary block anesthesia or patient positioning, carpal tunnel syndrome or other peripheral nerve compression, postoperative pain and functional deficit due to surgical trauma or venous hypertension, and postoperative swelling are all included in the differential diagnosis of IMN.

== Treatment ==
Immediate ischaemia correction by fistula/graft ligation or narrowing placation to lower the blood flow in the shunt is the advised treatment for IMN.

== See also ==
- Vascular access steal syndrome
- Arteriovenous fistula
