= Revision using distal inflow =

Surgical treatment

Revision using distal inflow (RUDI) is a surgical treatment for dialysis-associated steal syndrome. RUDI was first proposed by David J. Minion and colleagues in 2005. In the procedure, the fistula is ligated at a location slightly proximal to the anastomosis. A bypass to the venous outflow is then created from a distal arterial source.

In a review of a three studies on the efficacy of the technique, RUDI was shown to provide good patency (80%-100%) and 100% symptom resolution.
