= MILLER banding =

Medical technique

- Specialty: Nephrology

MILLER (Minimally Invasive Limited Ligation Endoluminal-assisted Revision) banding is a minimally invasive technique for banding dialysis accesses in cases of Dialysis-associated Steal Syndrome. MILLER banding was first proposed in 2006 by Goel N., Miller G.A., and colleagues.

== Procedure ==
A fistula or graft is dissected away through a small incision. An inflated intra-luminal balloon is used to provide a solid structure (thus allowing for precise sizing of the band), and a Prolene suture is tied around the access in the region of the balloon.

Clinical studies have reported favorable patency rates for accesses treated with MILLER banding. In a large cohort of 183 patients, secondary access patency reached 90% at 24 months, with low thrombotic event rates (0.1–0.9 per access-year depending on access type). Primary band patency was 75–85% at 6 months in steal and high-flow cases. These secondary patency rates are competitive with or superior to many revision procedures and comparable to matured autogenous arteriovenous fistulas (typically 70–90% secondary at 2 years), particularly when accounting for the 20–60% maturation failure rate of fistulas overall, which reduces their effective long-term usability to approximately 50–75%. MILLER banding provides high patency in salvage scenarios for high-flow accesses, often outperforming alternatives like traditional banding or plication in complication rates, while avoiding the maturation delays associated with primary fistula creation.

=== Integrated flow restriction in grafts and stents ===
While the MILLER banding procedure applies an external band post-implantation to restrict high flow in arteriovenous (AV) accesses, some patented designs incorporate flow-restrictive elements directly into the AV graft or stent itself. These aim to create a controlled pressure drop or stenosis to mitigate complications such as steal syndrome, venous hypertension causing venous stenosis, and excessive cardiac output demand, similar in principle to banding but integrated during graft construction or deployment. inventoror1-first Examples include patents by Stanley Batiste describing AV dialysis grafts with built-in reduced-diameter sections or adjustable stenoses:

- US 9907900B1, Batiste, Stanley & Easton, Dean, "A-V dialysis graft", published 2018-03-06 – Describes an AV graft with a normally reduced-diameter intermediate portion (or an inflatable annular stenosis balloon for variable/adjustable restriction) to provide a pressure drop from arterial to venous ends, minimizing venous stenosis and improving distal perfusion.
- US 7108673B1, Batiste, Stanley, "A-V dialysis graft construction", published 2006-09-19 – Outlines an intra-graft stenosis formed by a reduced-diameter intermediate portion (e.g., abrupt crimped segment with gradual tapering) to restrict blood flow and reduce venous irritation/stenosis at the anastomosis.

Such integrated approaches may simplify management of high-flow accesses by embedding restriction features, though clinical outcomes and adoption may vary compared to post-implant banding procedures.
