= Arteriolar vasodilator =

Substance or medication that preferentially dilates arterioles

Arteriolar vasodilators are substances or medications that preferentially dilate arterioles. When used on people with certain heart conditions, it causes a phenomenon known as the cardiac steal syndrome. Arteriolar vasodilators also increase intracapillary pressure, which causes fluid to enter the tissues, potentially leading to vasodilatory edema.

Arteriolar vasodilators include:

- hydralazine
- minoxidil
- nitroprusside
