= Hair-grooming syncope =

Type of fainting disorder

Hair-grooming syncope (also known as hair-combing syncope) is a form of syncope (a fainting disorder) associated with combing and brushing one's hair. It is most typically seen in children aged five to sixteen.

Hair-grooming syncope typically manifests as presyncopal symptoms during hair combing, brushing, braiding, trimming, curling or blow drying. These symptoms are followed by loss of consciousness and sometimes convulsions. Migraines, abdominal pain, "feeling funny" or blurred vision may also occur before or after episodes. Possible causes of the condition include pain or nerve stimulation on the scalp (similar to parade-ground syncope), or compression of blood vessels or nerves resulting from neck flexion or extension. A 2009 study identified 111 pediatric cases of hair-grooming syncope in the United States, almost three-quarters of which were in female patients; that study found that the condition is most associated with hair cutting in males and brushing in females.

Hair-grooming syncope may be misdiagnosed as epilepsy, but is better described as a "paroxysmal non-epileptic event". It may also be related to orthostatic hypotension. The condition is not associated with heart abnormalities.
