= Ulnar recurrent artery =

Ulnar recurrent artery can refer to:

- Anterior ulnar recurrent artery (ramus anterior arteriae recurrentis ulnaris)
- Posterior ulnar recurrent artery (ramus posterior arteriae recurrentis ulnaris)
