= Posterior ulnar recurrent artery =

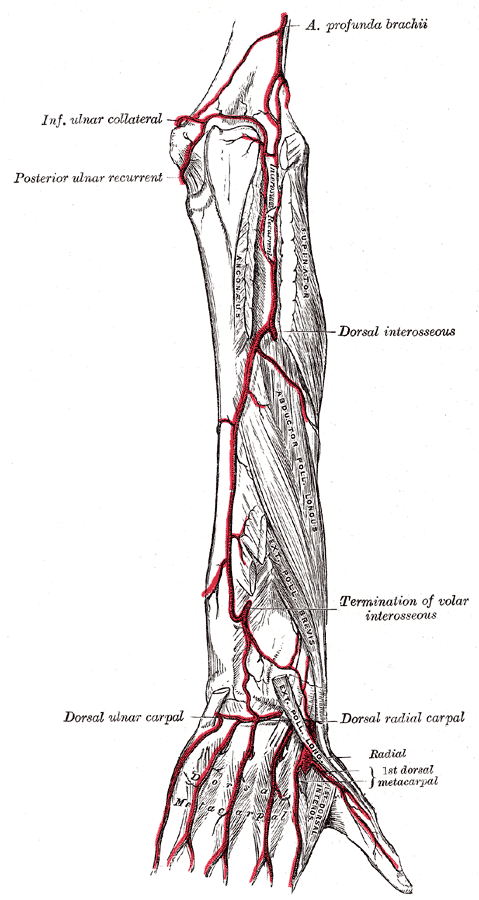
- Arteries of the back of the forearm and hand (posterior ulnar recurrent artery labeled at center left)

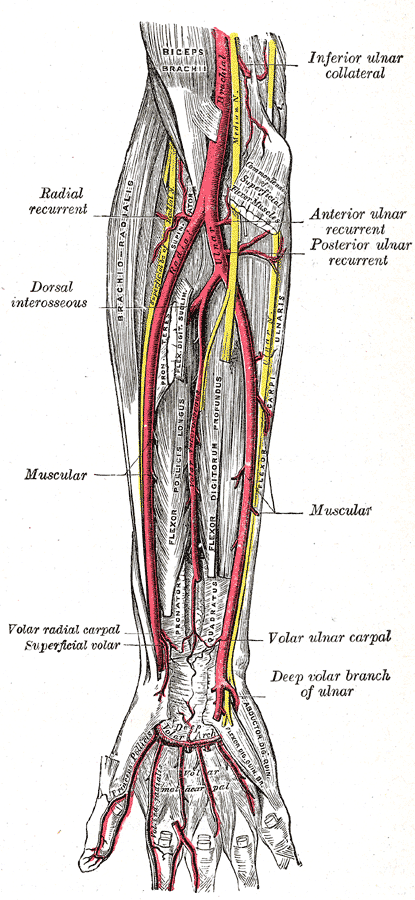
- Deep view of ulnar and radial arteries (posterior ulnar recurrent artery labeled at center right)

Details
- Source: Ulnar artery

Identifiers
- Latin: ramus posterior arteriae recurrentis ulnaris
- TA98: A12.2.09.044
- TA2: 4658
- FMA: 22803

The posterior ulnar recurrent artery is an artery in the forearm. It is one of two recurrent arteries that arises from the ulnar artery, the other being the anterior ulnar recurrent artery. The posterior ulnar recurrent artery being much larger than the anterior and also arises somewhat lower than it.

It passes backward and medialward on the flexor digitorum profundus, behind the flexor digitorum superficialis muscle, and ascends behind the medial epicondyle of the humerus.

In the interval between this process and the olecranon, it lies beneath the flexor carpi ulnaris, and ascending between the heads of that muscle, in relation with the ulnar nerve, it supplies the neighboring muscles and the elbow-joint, and anastomoses with the superior and inferior ulnar collateral arteries and the interosseous recurrent arteries.

== See also ==
- Anterior ulnar recurrent artery
