= Inferior ulnar collateral artery =

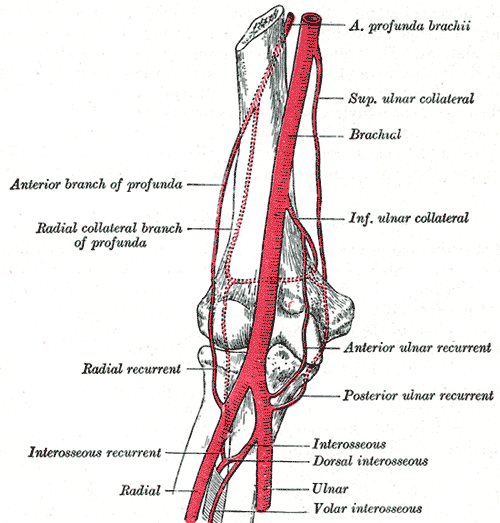
- Diagram of the anastomosis around the elbow joint (inferior ulnar collateral labeled at center right)

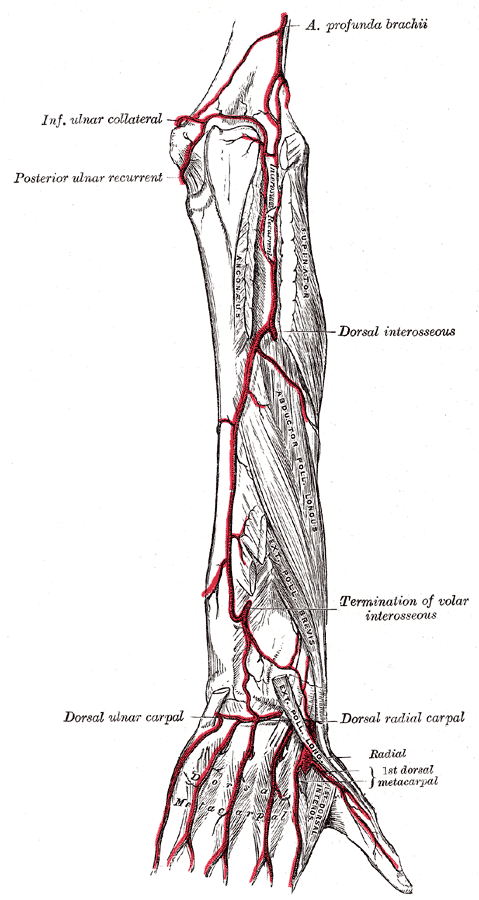
- Arteries of the back of the forearm and hand (inferior ulnar collateral labeled at upper left)

Details
- Source: Brachial artery

Identifiers
- Latin: arteria collateralis ulnaris inferior
- TA98: A12.2.09.026
- TA2: 4640
- FMA: 22710

The inferior ulnar collateral artery (anastomotica magna artery) is an artery in the arm. It arises about 5 cm. above the elbow from the brachial artery.

== Course ==
It passes medialward upon the brachialis, and piercing the medial intermuscular septum, winds around the back of the humerus between the triceps brachii and the bone, forming, by its junction with the profunda brachii, an arch above the olecranon fossa.

== Branches and anastomoses ==
As the vessel lies on the brachialis, it gives off branches which ascend to join the superior ulnar collateral: others descend in front of the medial epicondyle, to anastomose with the anterior ulnar recurrent.

Behind the medial epicondyle a branch anastomoses with the superior ulnar collateral and posterior ulnar recurrent arteries.

== Additional images ==
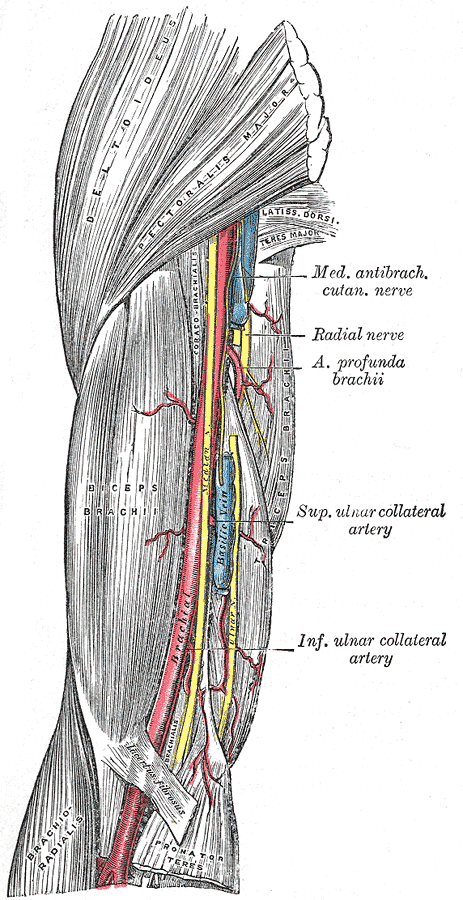
The brachial artery.

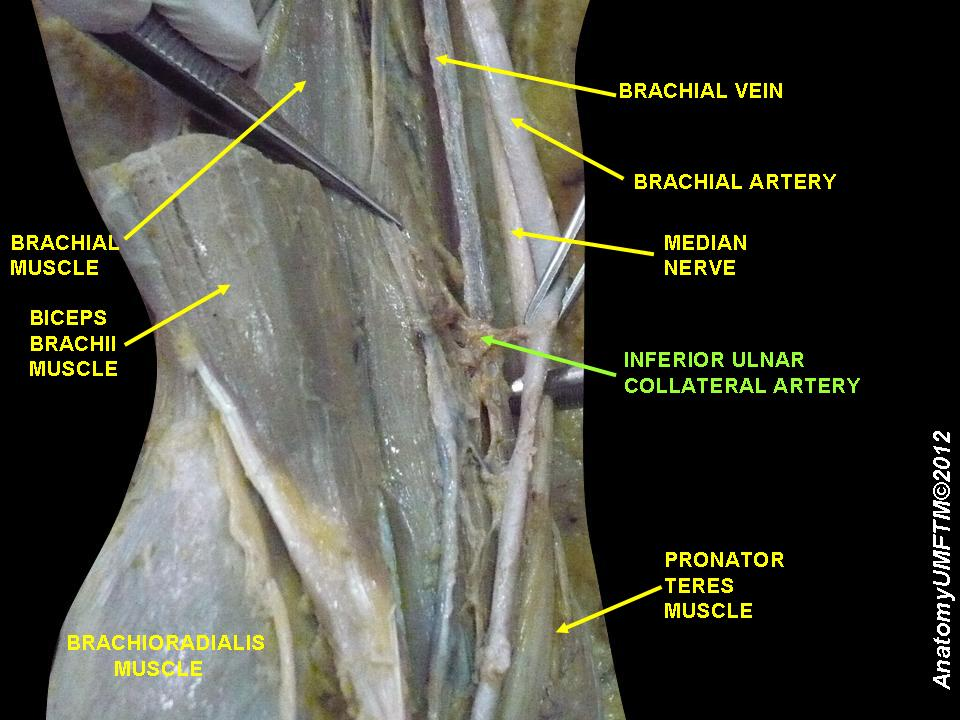
Inferior ulnar collateral artery
