= Superior ulnar collateral artery =

Artery

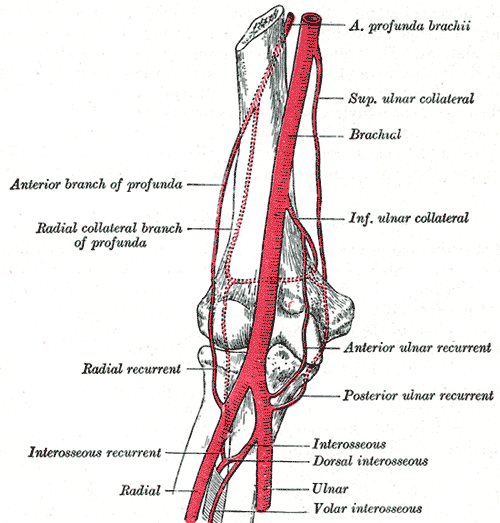
- Diagram of the anastomosis around the elbow joint. (Sup. ulnar collateral labeled at upper right.)

Details
- Source: Brachial artery, inferior ulnar collateral artery
- Branches: posterior ulnar recurrent artery

Identifiers
- Latin: arteria collateralis ulnaris superior
- TA98: A12.2.09.025
- TA2: 4639
- FMA: 22706

The superior ulnar collateral artery (inferior profunda artery), of small size, arises from the brachial artery a little below the middle of the arm; it frequently springs from the upper part of the a. profunda brachii.

It pierces the medial intermuscular septum, and descends on the surface of the medial head of the Triceps brachii to the space between the medial epicondyle and olecranon, accompanied by the ulnar nerve, and ends under the Flexor carpi ulnaris by anastomosing with the posterior ulnar recurrent, and inferior ulnar collateral.

It sometimes sends a branch in front of the medial epicondyle, to anastomose with the anterior ulnar recurrent.

== Additional images ==
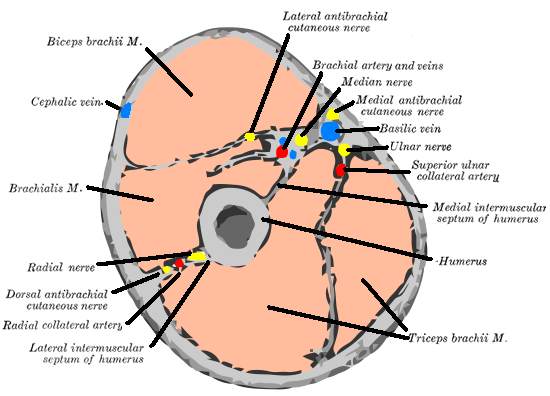
Cross-section through the middle of upper arm.

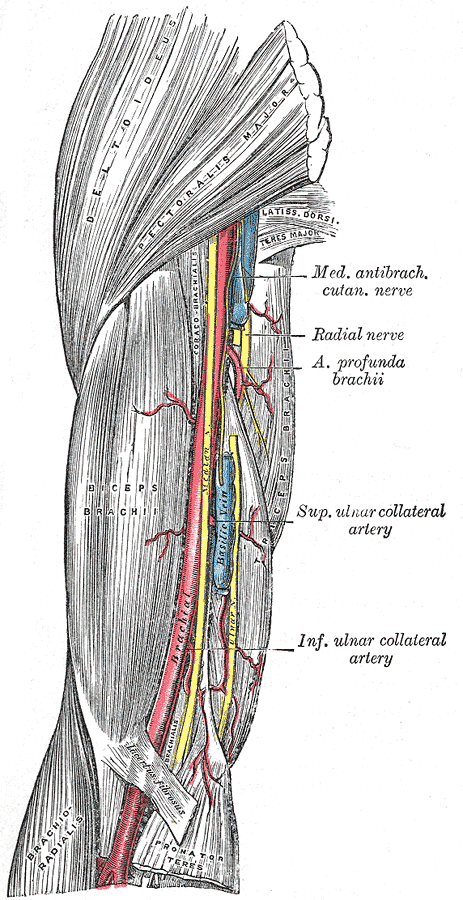
The brachial artery.
