= San Francisco Syncope Rule =

Evaluation system of fainting patients

The San Francisco Syncope Rule (SFSR) is a rule for evaluating the risk of adverse outcomes in patients presenting with fainting or syncope.

The mnemonic for features of the rule is CHESS:

• C - History of congestive heart failure

• H - Hematocrit < 30%

• E - Abnormal ECG

• S - Shortness of breath

• S - Triage systolic blood pressure < 90

A patient with any of the above measures is considered at high risk for a serious outcome such as death, myocardial infarction, arrhythmia, pulmonary embolism, stroke, subarachnoid hemorrhage, significant hemorrhage, or any condition causing a return Emergency Department visit and hospitalization for a related event.

SFSR was retrospectively found to have 98% sensitivity and specificity of 56% for serious causes of syncope. However, external prospective validation of the criteria found sensitivity to be 74%, substantially lower than the initial study. This means that in patients with none of the above criteria, potentially serious causes of syncope were missed in over a quarter of patients. Syncope accounts for 1-2% emergency department visits. Half are hospitalized and of these, 50% have unclear diagnosis and 85% will be simply monitored.
