= Coronary steal =

Altered circulation and reduced blood flow

Coronary steal (with its symptoms termed coronary steal syndrome or cardiac steal syndrome) is a phenomenon where an alteration of circulation patterns leads to a reduction in the blood flow directed to the coronary circulation. It is caused when there is narrowing of the coronary arteries and a coronary vasodilator is used – "stealing" blood away from those parts of the heart.

This happens as a result of the narrowed coronary arteries being always maximally dilated to compensate for the decreased upstream blood supply. Thus, dilating the resistance vessels in the coronary circulation causes blood to be shunted away from the coronary vessels supplying the ischemic zones, creating more ischemia.

== Signs and symptoms ==
Mild coronary steal may occur without any symptoms, but as the syndrome progresses, chest pain is usually the first obvious symptom. In worse cases, symptoms can include dizziness, flushing, headaches, nausea, and shortness of breath.

== Cause ==
It is associated with dipyridamole. Dipyridamole is thus a pharmacological success diagnostically, but a therapeutic failure because of the coronary steal phenomenon.

Coronary steal is also the mechanism in most drug-based cardiac stress tests; When a patient is incapable of doing physical activity they are given a vasodilator that produces a "cardiac steal syndrome" as a diagnostic procedure. The test result is positive if the patient's symptoms reappear or if ECG alterations are seen.

Hydralazine can potentially cause this condition as well, as it is a direct arteriolar vasodilator.

It has been associated with nitroprusside.

=== Other causes ===
Coronary arteriovenous fistula between coronary artery and another cardiac chamber, like, the coronary sinus, right atrium, or right ventricle may cause steal syndrome under conditions like myocardial infarction and possible angina or ventricular arrhythmias, if the shunt is large in magnitude.

It can also be associated with new patterns of blood vessel growth.

== Diagnosis ==
Coronary steal syndrome can be diagnosed by:

- Electrocardiogram.
- Computed tomography angiogram.
- Coronary angiography.
- Stress testing with myocardial perfusion imaging.

== Treatment ==
Coronary steal is sometimes treated by surgery.

== See also ==
- Subclavian steal syndrome
- Vascular resistance
- Arteriolar vasodilator
