= Anterior ulnar recurrent artery =

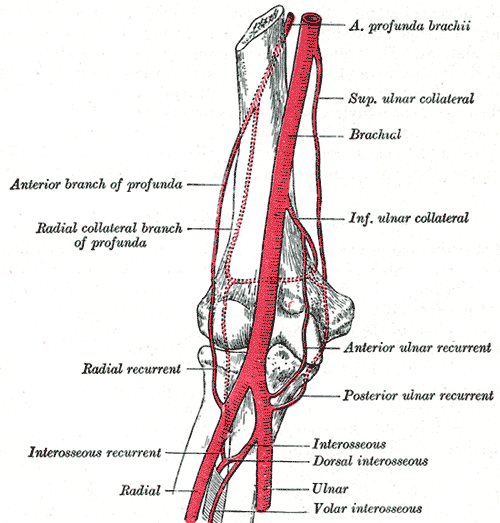
- Diagram of the anastomosis around the elbow-joint (anterior ulnar recurrent artery labeled at center right)

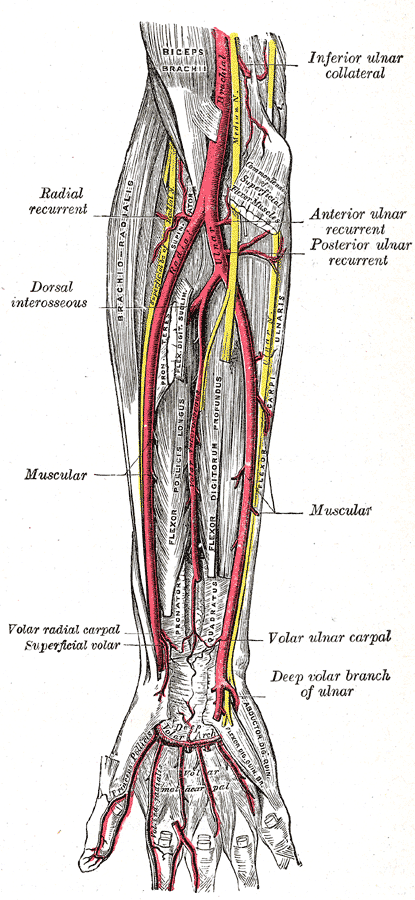
- Deep view of ulnar and radial arteries (anterior ulnar recurrent artery labeled at center right)

Details
- Source: Ulnar artery
- Branches: Inferior ulnar collateral artery

Identifiers
- Latin: ramus anterior arteriae recurrentis ulnaris
- TA98: A12.2.09.043
- TA2: 4657
- FMA: 22800

The anterior ulnar recurrent artery is an artery in the forearm. It is one of two recurrent arteries that arises from the ulnar artery, the other being the posterior ulnar recurrent artery.

It arises from the ulnar artery immediately below the elbow-joint, runs upward between the brachialis and pronator teres muscle and supplies twigs to those muscles. In front of the medial epicondyle it anastomoses with the superior and Inferior ulnar collateral arteries.

== See also ==
- Posterior ulnar recurrent artery
