= Vascular access steal syndrome =

- Specialty: Nephrology

Vascular access steal syndrome is a syndrome caused by ischemia (not enough blood flow) resulting from a vascular access device (such as an arteriovenous fistula or synthetic vascular graft–AV fistula) that was installed to provide access for the inflow and outflow of blood during hemodialysis.

== Signs ==
- Pallor
- Diminished pulses (distal to the fistula)
- Necrosis
- Decreased wrist-brachial index (ratio of blood pressure measured in the wrist and the blood pressure measured in the upper arm), especially if below 0.6

=== Symptoms ===
- Pain distal to the fistula.

Symptoms are graded by their severity:

- Grade 0: No symptoms of steal
- Grade 1: Mild - cool extremity, improvement in hand pulse with access occlusion
- Grade 2: Moderate - Ischemic symptoms during dialysis
- Grade 3: Severe - Ischemic hand pain outside of dialysis; Ulcers or gangrene of the fingers

== Diagnosis ==
- History and physical exam - relief of symptoms with compression of the fistula on exam is highly suggestive of steal
- Arteriography
- Duplex ultrasound

== Treatment ==
The fistula flow can be restricted through banding, or modulated through surgical revision.

=== Revascularization techniques ===
- Distal Revascularization and Interval Ligation (DRIL) procedure
- PAI (Proximalization of the Arterial Inflow)
- RUDI (Revision Using Distal Inflow)

=== Banding techniques ===
- Narrowing suture
- Plication
- Minimally invasive MILLER banding
- Tapering
- Surgical banding

If the above methods fail, the fistula is ligated, and a new fistula is created in a more proximal location in the same limb, or in the contralateral limb.

==== Integrated flow restriction in grafts and stents ====
While banding techniques such as MILLER banding apply external constriction to the outflow vein post-implantation to reduce excessive flow in arteriovenous (AV) accesses, some patented designs incorporate flow-restrictive elements directly into the AV graft or stent during construction or deployment. These create a controlled stenosis or reduced-diameter section to regulate blood flow, create a pressure drop, preserve distal perfusion, and mitigate complications such as steal syndrome, venous hypertension, and excessive cardiac demand—similar in hemodynamic effect to external banding but integrated into the device itself.

Examples include patents by Stanley Batiste describing AV dialysis grafts with built-in flow restrictions:

- US 9907900B1, Batiste, Stanley & Easton, Dean, "A-V dialysis graft", published 2018-03-06 – Describes an AV graft with a normally reduced-diameter intermediate portion or an inflatable annular stenosis balloon for adjustable restriction, providing a pressure drop from arterial to venous ends while minimizing venous stenosis and improving distal limb perfusion.
- US 7108673B1, Batiste, Stanley, "A-V dialysis graft construction", published 2006-09-19 – Outlines an intra-graft stenosis formed by a reduced-diameter intermediate portion (e.g., abrupt crimped segment with gradual tapering) to restrict blood flow and reduce venous irritation/stenosis at the anastomosis.
- Related patents in the family (e.g., US 12514968B2, Batiste, Stan, "AV flow restrictors", published 2026-01-06) cover dialysis stents/shunts with elastic stenosis bands or expandable restrictions, allowing dynamic adjustment (e.g., via balloon expansion) for flow control in AV fistulas or grafts.

Such integrated designs may simplify management of high-flow accesses by embedding restriction features, though clinical outcomes, adoption, and direct comparisons to post-implant banding procedures like MILLER remain device-specific and variable.

== Incidence ==
DASS occurs in about 1% of AV fistulas and 2.7-8% of PTFE grafts.

== See also ==
- Terms for anatomical location
