= Ganglion cyst =

Fluid-filled sac growth found on joints or tendon sheaths

- Other names: Ganglia, synovial cyst, Gideon's disease, Olamide's cyst, Bible cyst, Bible bump
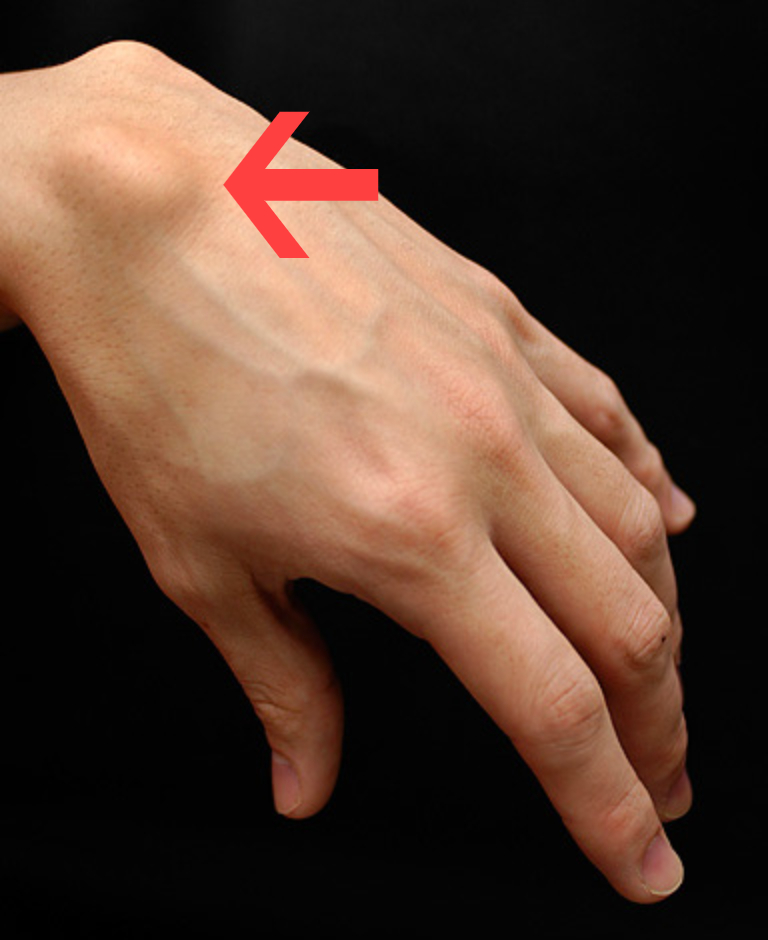
- Cyst on dorsum of left hand close to the wrist
- Specialty: Plastic surgery, orthopedic surgery, hand surgery
- Symptoms: Small soft bump associated with a joint or tendon sheath
- Complications: Only with operative treatment
- Usual onset: Any age
- Diagnostic method: Typically based on signs
- Differential diagnosis: Lipoma, extensor tenosynovitis
- Treatment: Watchful waiting, splinting the affected joint, needle aspiration, surgery
- Prognosis: Not serious
- Frequency: ~3 per 10,000 per year (wrist and hand)

A ganglion cyst is a fluid-filled sac associated with a joint or tendon sheath. It most often occurs at the back of the wrist, followed by the front of the wrist.

The cause is unknown. The underlying mechanism is believed to involve an outpouching of the synovial membrane. Diagnosis is typically based on examination. The ability to shine light through the bump or any past decrease in size supports the diagnosis of the bump as a ganglion cyst. Ganglion cysts are usually obvious upon observation. Medical imaging may be considered on infrequent occasions to rule out another diagnosis.

Treatment is not necessary. Options for treatment include needle aspiration or surgery. About half the time, they resolve on their own. About three per 10,000 people develop a ganglion cyst of the wrist or hand a year.

== Presentation ==
The average size of these cysts is 2 centimetres (0.79 in), but excised cysts of more than 5 centimetres (2.0 in) have been reported. The size of the cyst may vary over time. Between 50 and 70% of all masses on the hand and wrist are ganglion cysts.

=== Wrist ===
They commonly are found near the wrist joint, especially at the scapholunate area.

Common wrist ganglions include:

- dorsal wrist ganglion
- volar wrist ganglion
- extensor retinaculum ganglion
- intraosseous ganglion
- mucous cyst

=== Foot ===
In a 2007 study of patients in Glasgow whose foot lumps were removed surgically, 39 of 101 cases were ganglion cysts. The study replicated earlier findings that no ganglion cysts were found on the sole or heel. The authors wrote, "Although lumps in these areas may be ganglia, the surgeon should probably consider other diagnoses in the first instance." The researchers noted a preponderance of occurrence among females (85%) and that 11 of the other cases had been misdiagnosed as ganglion cysts before surgery.

=== Lower extremity ===
Ganglion cysts are not limited to the hands and feet. They may occur near the knee, mostly within and near the anterior cruciate ligament, but they may occur at the origins of the gastrocnemius tendon, and anteriorly on Hoffa's infrapatellar fat pad. Most patients with a ganglion cyst of the knee present with both pain and a restricted range of motion, but these findings are variable, and some patients may have neither.

=== Other ===
From their common origin at a joint or tendon, ganglion cysts may form in a wide range of locations. At the shoulder, they typically occur at the acromioclavicular joint or along the biceps tendon, and are occasionally known to cause nerve compression or bone erosion. Rarely, intraosseous ganglion cysts occur, sometimes in combination with a cyst in the overlying soft tissue. It is possible for a cyst to be considerably displaced from the joint. In one extreme case, a ganglion cyst was observed to propagate extensively via the conduit of the common peroneal nerve sheath to a location in the thigh; in such cases surgery to the proximal joint to remove the articular connection may remove the need for a riskier, more extensive surgery in the neural tissue of the thigh. The cysts may intrude into the spine, which may cause pain and dysesthesia in distant extremities.

Cystic adventitial disease, in which a cyst occurs within the popliteal artery near the knee, has been proposed recently to occur by an articular mechanism, with a conduit leading from the joint, similar to the development of ganglion cysts, that spreads within the peroneal nerve. One uncommon location of the cysts are in the muscle tendons of the hand, such as the extensor digitorum superficialis.

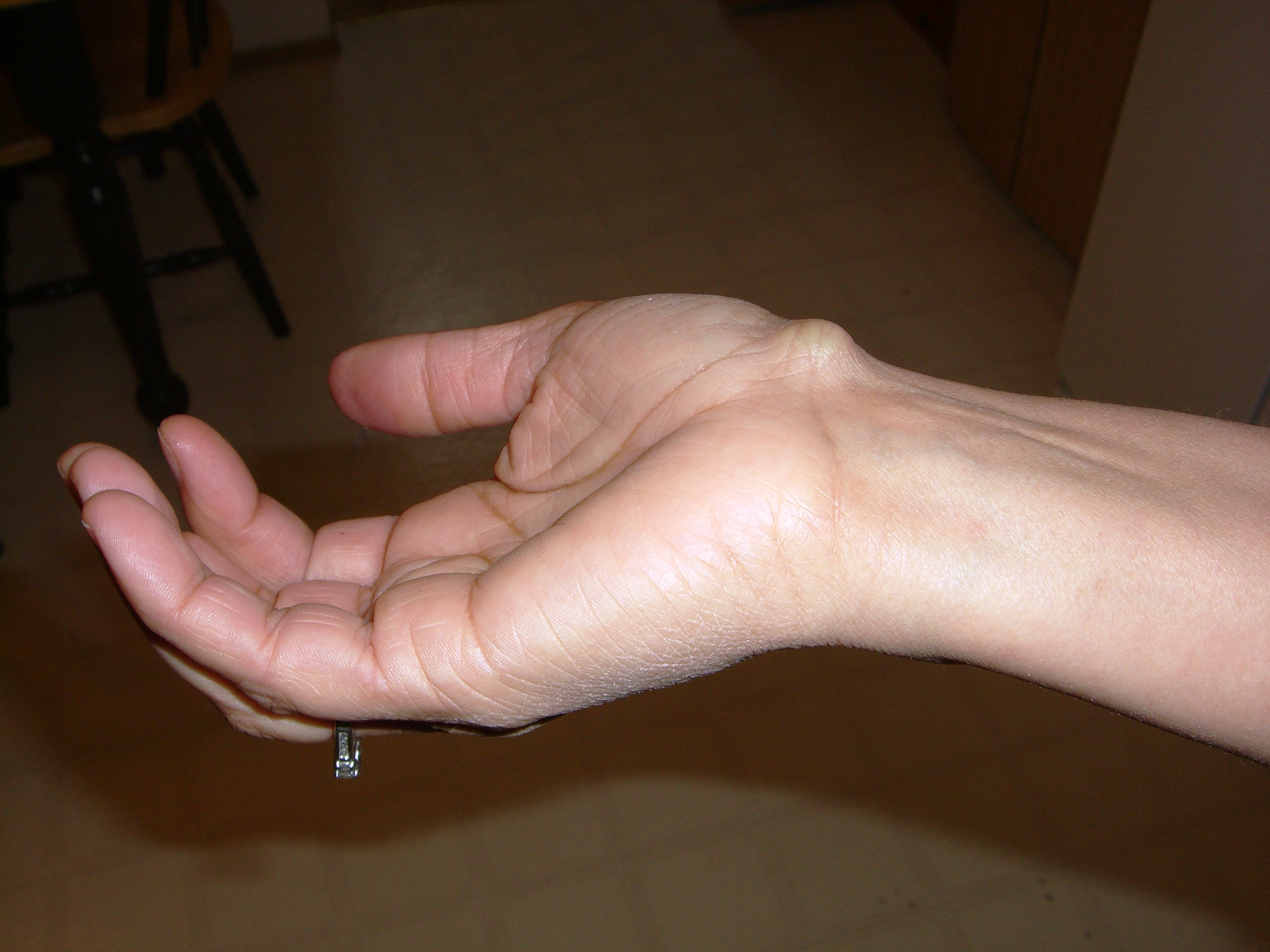
Cyst on right wrist

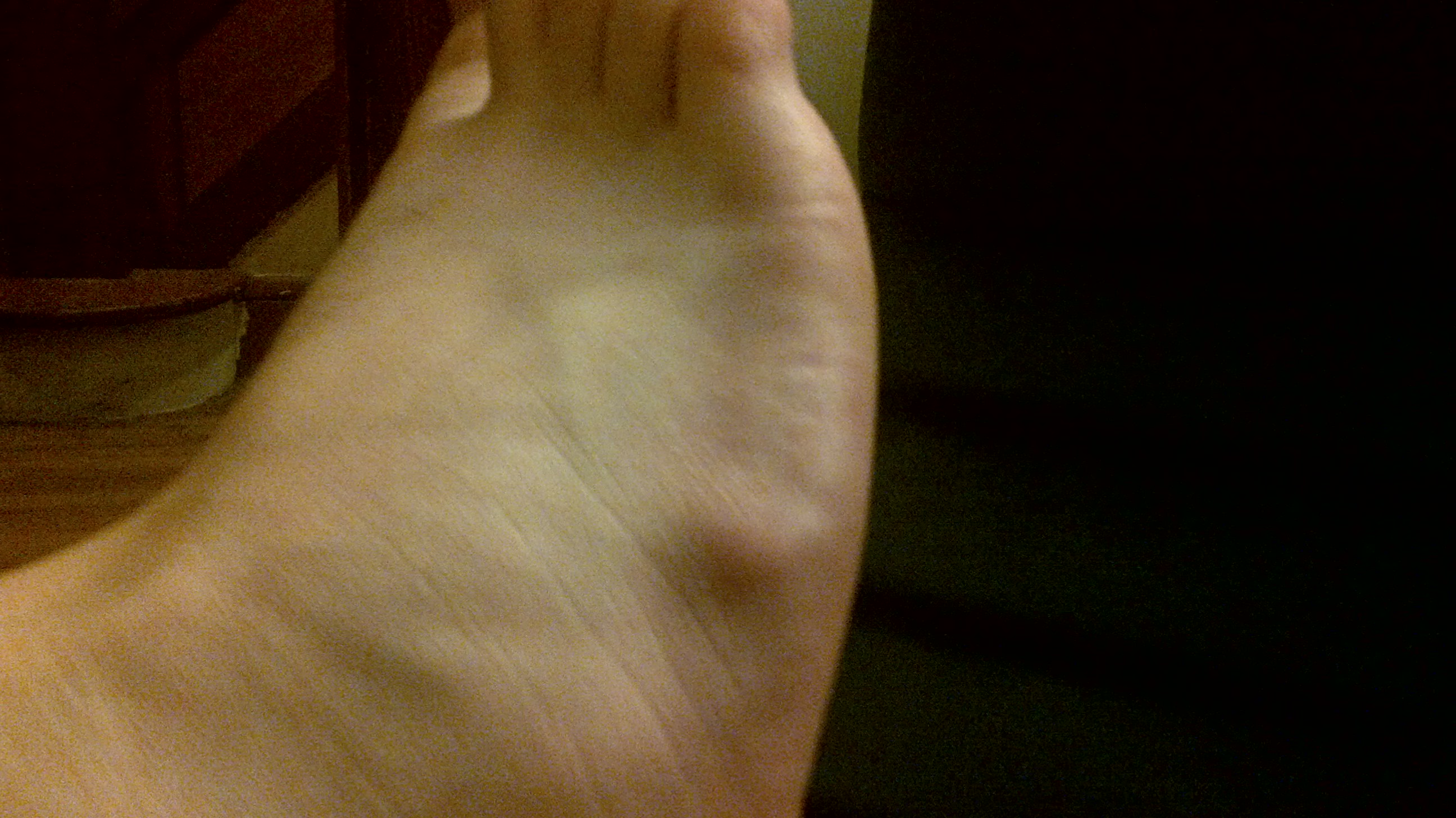
Cyst on dorsum of right foot

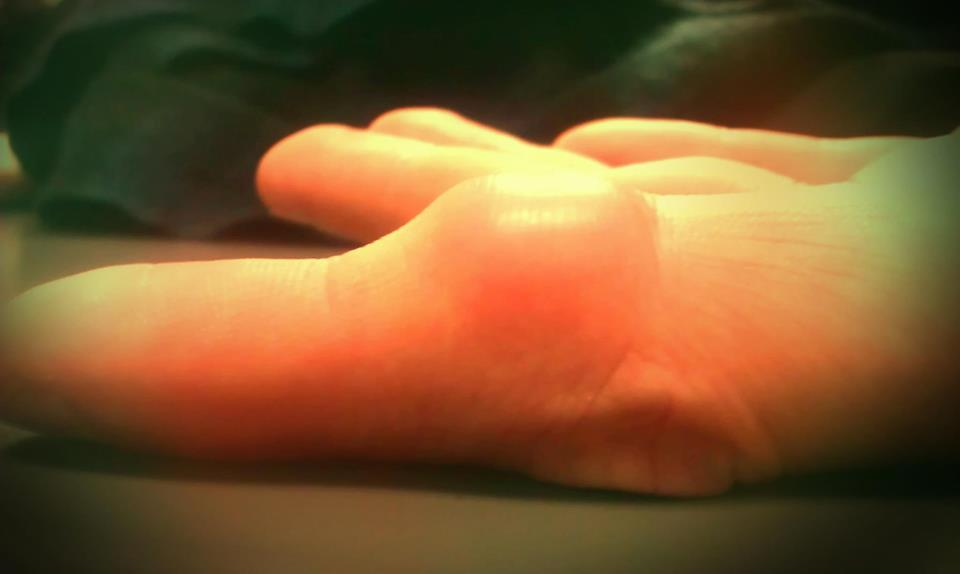
Cyst on a finger

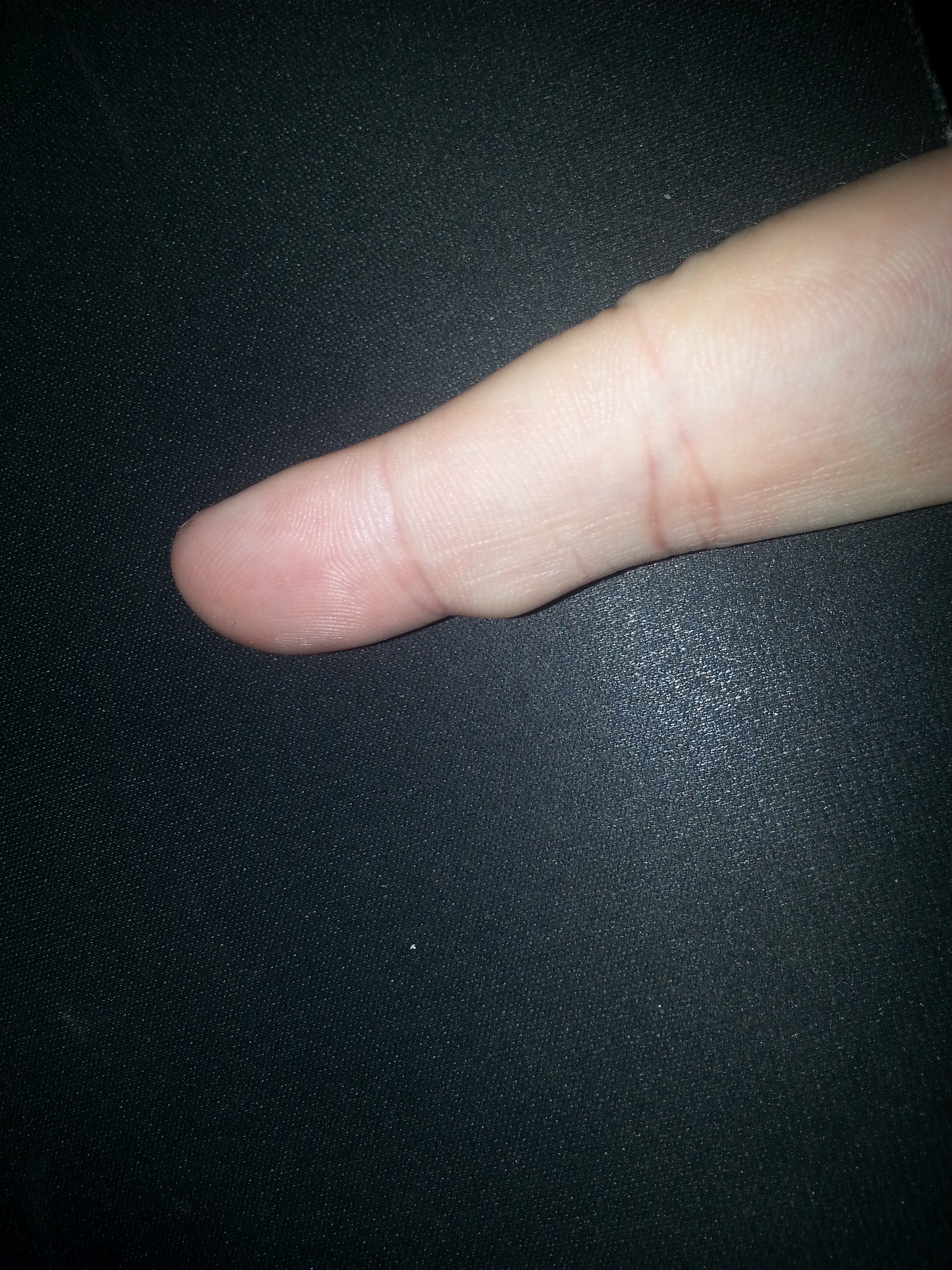
Small cyst on right index finger

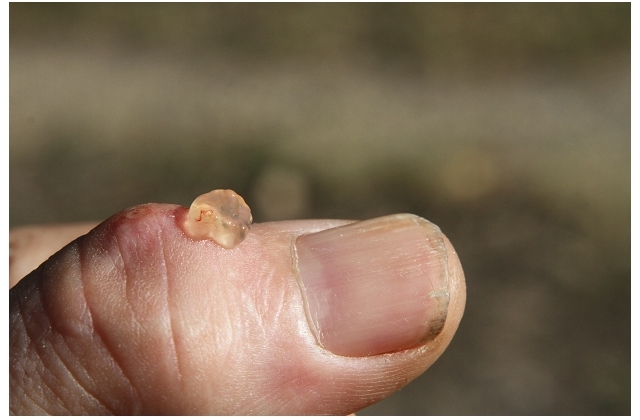
small cyst on thumb lanced with red-hot needle

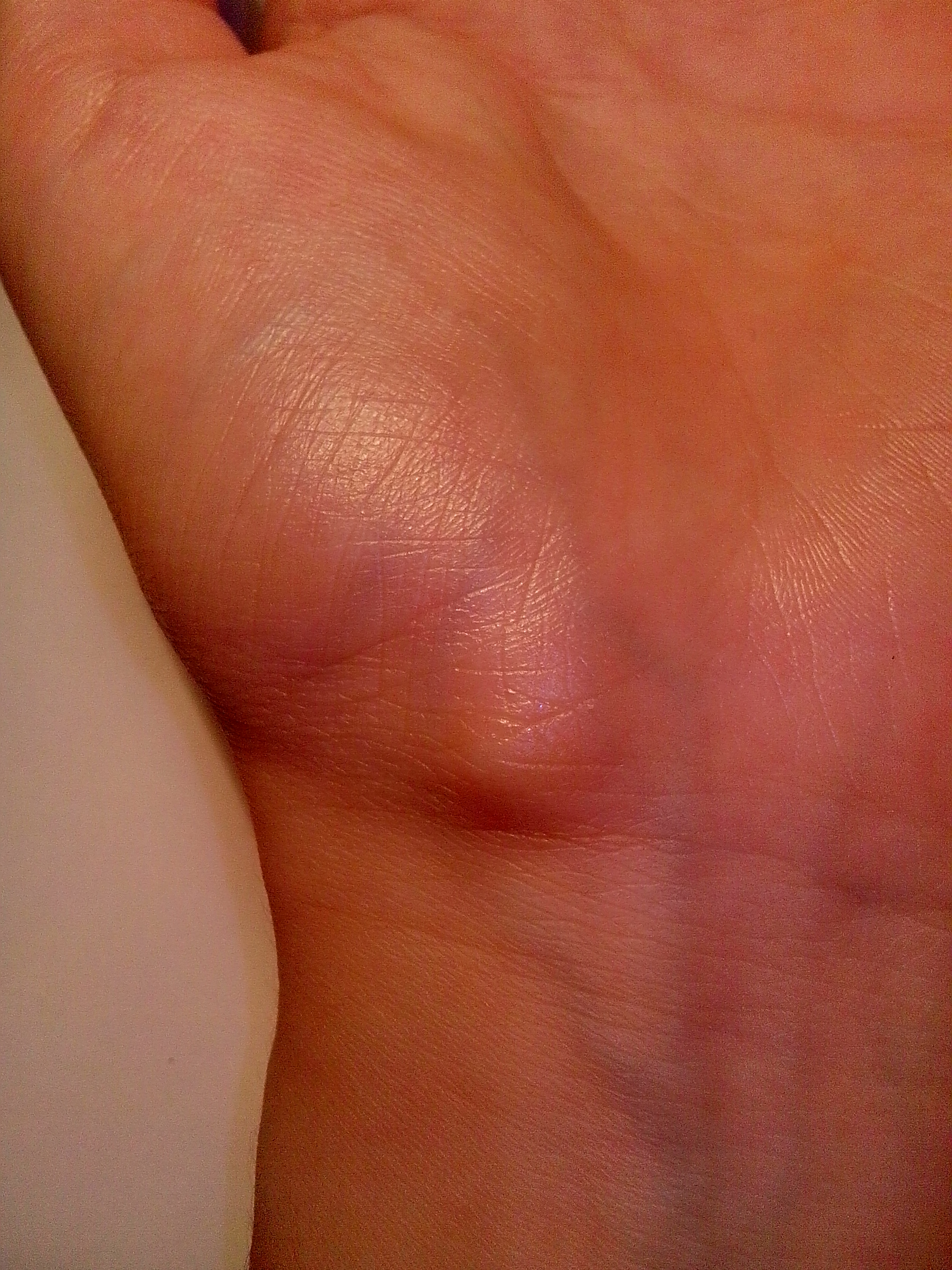
Ganglion cyst on the palmar side of the left wrist

== Causes ==
The exact cause is unknown. The most commonly accepted probable cause of ganglion cysts is the herniation hypothesis, by which they are thought to occur as an out-pouching or distention of a weakened portion of a joint capsule or tendon sheath. This description is based on the observations that the cysts occur close to tendons and joints. The microscopic anatomy of the cyst resembles that of tenosynovial tissue. The fluid is similar in composition to synovial fluid. Dye injected into the joint frequently ends up in the cyst. Dye injected into the cyst rarely enters the joint, however, which has been attributed to the apparent formation of an effective and one-way "check valve", allowing fluid out of the joint, but not back in.

In synovials, post-traumatic degeneration of connective tissue and inflammation have been considered as causes. Other possible mechanisms for the development of ganglion cysts include repeated mechanical stress, facet arthrosis, myxoid degeneration of periarticular fibrous tissues and liquefaction with chronic damage, increased production of hyaluronic acid by fibroblasts, and a proliferation of mesenchymal cells.

== Diagnosis ==
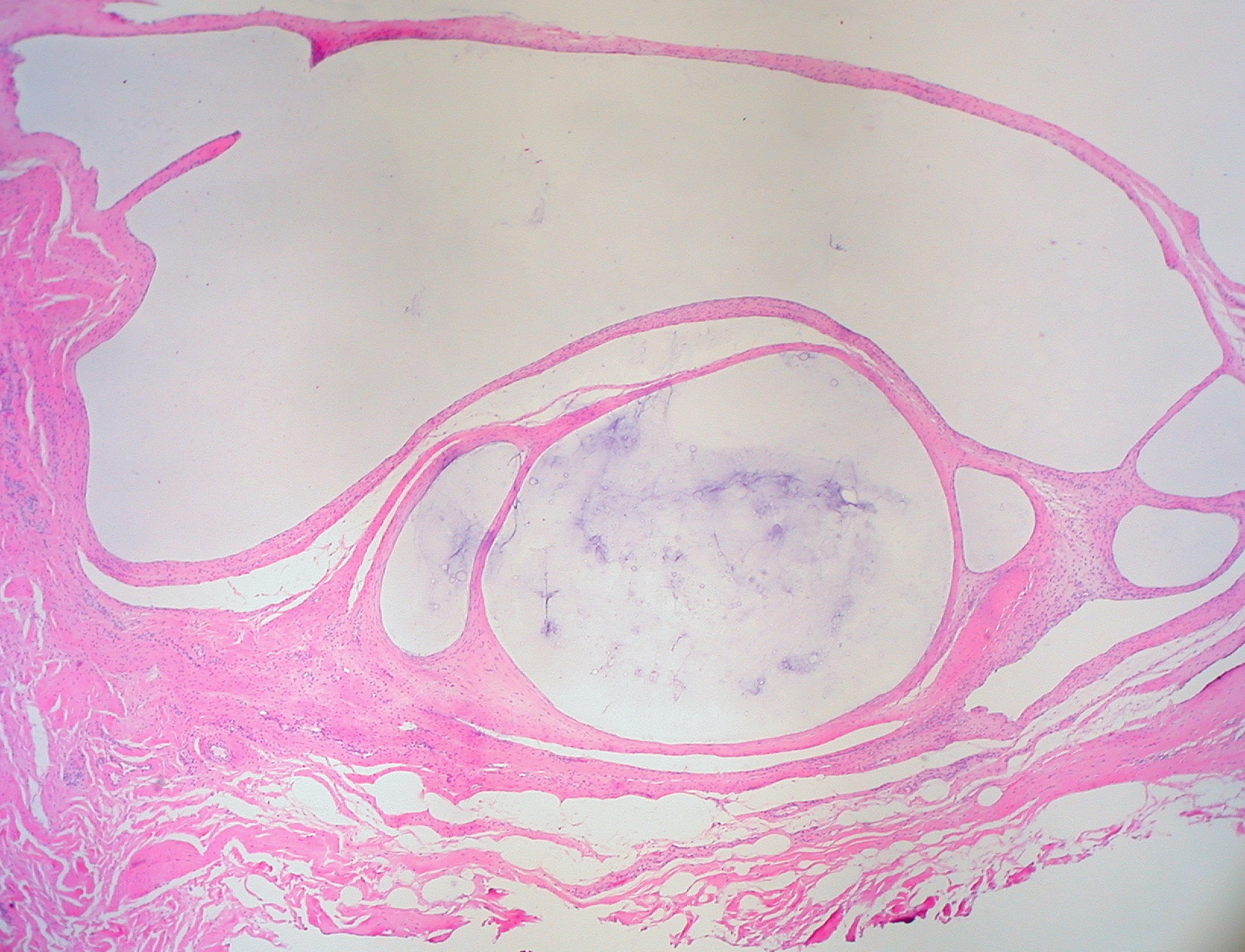
Ganglion cyst of the hand with multiple cystic chambers containing glairy material - the walls are composed of bland fibrous tissue with no specialized lining.

Normal sized Ganglion cysts are usually diagnosed easily, as they are easily visible and pliable to touch.

For Ganglion cysts Medical imaging may be used to increase diagnostic confidence in clinically suspected lesions or to view smaller "occult" cysts as a cause of dorsal wrist pain with forceful extension.

== Treatment ==
At least 33% resolve without treatment within six years, and 50% within 10 years.

Surgical excision is the primary discretionary, elective treatment option for ganglion cysts. Alternatively, a hypodermic needle may be used to drain the fluid from the cyst (via aspiration). The recurrence rate is about 50% following aspiration of a ganglion cyst.

=== Complications ===
Complications of treatment may include joint stiffness and scar formation. Recurrence of the lesion is more common following excision of a volar ganglion cyst in the wrist. Incomplete excision that fails to include the stalk or pedicle also may lead to recurrence, as will failing to execute a layered closure of the incision.

== Prognosis ==
Recurrence rate is higher in aspirated cysts than in excised ones. Ganglion cysts have been found to recur following surgery in 12% to 41% of patients.

A six-year outcome study of the treatment of ganglion cysts on the dorsal wrist compared excision, aspiration, and no treatment. Neither excision nor aspiration provided long-term benefit better than no treatment. Of the untreated ganglion cysts, 58% resolved spontaneously; the postsurgery recurrence rate in this study was 39%. A similar study in 2003 of ganglion cysts occurring on the palmar surface of the wrist states: "At 2- and 5-year follow-up, regardless of treatment, no difference in symptoms was found, regardless of whether the palmar wrist ganglion was excised, aspirated, or left alone."

== Etymology ==
Being a misnomer that has persisted into modern times, the ganglion cyst is unrelated to the neural ganglion or ganglion cell; its etymology traces back to the ancient Greek γάγγλιον, a 'knot' or 'swelling beneath the skin', which extends to the neural masses by analogy. Generally, Hippocrates is credited with the description of these cysts.

== "Bible bump" ==
A historical method of treatment for a ganglion cyst was to strike the lump with a large, heavy book, causing the cyst to rupture and drain into the surrounding tissues. Historically, a Bible, usually the largest (or only) book in a household, was employed for this treatment. This practice led to the nickname of "Bible bumps" or "Gideon's disease" for the cysts. This treatment risks injuring the person and thus is not recommended.

== See also ==
- Ganglioneuroma
