= Alexander L. Coon =

American neurosurgeon

Alexander Coon
- Born: Milwaukee, Wisconsin, U.S.
- Education: University of Kentucky College of Engineering; Columbia College of Physicians and Surgeons
- Title: Director of Endovascular and Cerebrovascular Neurosurgery
- Scientific career
- Fields: Cerebrovascular & endovascular neurosurgery
- Workplaces: Carondelet Neurological Institute Johns Hopkins University

Alexander Coon is an American neurosurgeon who is the director of endovascular and cerebrovascular neurosurgery at the Carondelet Neurological Institute of St. Joseph's and St. Mary's Hospitals in Tucson, Arizona. He was previously the director of endovascular neurosurgery at the Johns Hopkins Hospital and an assistant professor of neurosurgery, neurology, and radiology at the Johns Hopkins Hospital. He is known for his work in cerebrovascular and endovascular neurosurgery and his research in neuroendovascular devices and clinical outcomes in the treatment of cerebral aneurysms, subarachnoid hemorrhage, and AVMs.

== Education and career ==
Coon attended the University of Kentucky College of Engineering, where he graduated with a Bachelor of Science degree in chemical engineering. He attended medical school at Columbia University College of Physicians and Surgeons, where he graduated in 2003.

Coon completed his neurosurgical residency and a fellowship in endovascular neurosurgery at Johns Hopkins Hospital. In 2010, he joined the faculty at Johns Hopkins University School of Medicine as assistant professor of neurosurgery, Neurology, and Radiology and Radiological Science, and then assumed the position of Director of Endovascular Neurosurgery and the Endovascular Neurosurgery Fellowship Program.

In 2011, Coon performed some of the first FDA-approved endovascular flow diversion cases with the Pipeline Embolization Device (Medtronic) and adjunctive coiling to treat a giant cerebral aneurysm. This endovascular treatment of coil-assisted flow diversion avoided the expected functional impairments resulting from an open microsurgical vascular approach.

== Research ==
Coon's research mainly focuses on clinical outcomes associated with neurovascular devices and cerebrovascular microsurgery. His efforts center on developing techniques to push the field of cerebrovascular neurosurgery forward in safe and effective treatment for cerebral aneurysms, arterial dissections, carotid stenosis, AVMs, dural AV fistulas, tumors, and spinal vascular pathology. He has published extensively in the field of aneurysm treatment, stroke, and subarachnoid hemorrhage (SAH).

== Selected publications ==
- Endovascular flow diversion for treatment of anterior communicating artery region cerebral aneurysms: a single-center cohort of 50 cases. Colby GP, Bender MT, Lin LM, Beaty N, Huang J, Tamargo RJ, *Coon AL. J Neurointerv Surg. 2017 Jul;9(7):679-685. doi:10.1136/neurintsurg-2016-012946. Epub 2017 Jan 27.
- Flow diversion of large internal carotid artery aneurysms with the Surpass Device: Impressions and technical nuance from the initial North American experience. Colby GP, Lin LM, Caplan JM, Jiang B, Michniewicz B, Huang J, Tamargo RJ, Coon AL. J Neurointerv Surg. 2016 Mar;8(3):279-86. doi:10.1136/neurintsurg-2015-011769
- Long-term Outcomes of Patients With Giant Intracranial Arteriovenous Malformations. Yang W, Wei Z, Wang JY, Hung A, Caplan JM, Braileanu M, Colby GP, Coon AL, Tamargo RJ, *Huang J. Neurosurgery. 2016 Jul;79(1):116-24. doi:10.1227/NEU.0000000000001189
- Immediate and follow-up results for 44 consecutive cases of small (<10mm) internal carotid artery aneurysms treated with the Pipeline embolization device. Lin LM, Colby GP, Kim JE, Huang J, Tamargo RJ, Coon AL. Surgical Neurology International. 2013 Sep 6;4:114. doi:10.4103/2152-7806.117711
- Simvastatin reduces vasospasm after aneurysmal subarachnoid hemorrhage: results of a pilot randomized clinical trial. Lynch JR, Wang H, McGirt MJ, Floyd J, Friedman AH, Coon AL, Blessing R, Alexander MJ, Graffagnino C, Warner DS, *Laskowitz DT. Stroke. 2005;36(9): 2024–6.
- Utilization of a Novel, Multi-Durometer Intracranial Distal Access Catheter: Nuances and Experience in 110 Consecutive Cases of Aneurysm Flow Diversion. Colby GP, Lin LM, Xu R, Beaty N, Bender MT, Jiang B, Huang J, Tamargo RJ, Coon AL. Interv Neurol. 2017 Mar;6(1-2):90-104. doi: 10.1159/000456086. Epub 2017 Feb 3.
- Resolution of giant basilar artery aneurysm compression and reversal of sensorineural hearing loss with use of a flow diverter: case report. Mohammad LM, Coon AL, Carlson AP. J Neurosurg Pediatr. 2017 Jul;20(1):81-85. doi: 10.3171/2016.9.PEDS16428. Epub 2017 Apr 28.
