= Popliteal artery aneurysm =

Dilation of a leg artery

- Specialty: Vascular surgery, interventional radiology
- Symptoms: None, leg pain
- Risk factors: Smoking, hypertension, other cardiovascular disease, family history, Marfan syndrome
- Prevention: Not smoking, treating risk factors
- Treatment: Surgery (open surgery or endovascular aneurysm repair)

A popliteal artery aneurysm (PAA) is an enlargement of the popliteal artery to greater than 1.5 times its normal size. (Note: The normal diameter of a popliteal artery is 0.7–1.1 cm.) PAAs are the most common type of aneurysm of the peripheral vascular system, accounting for 85% of all cases. Roughly half of all popliteal aneurysms appear on both legs, being associated with an abdominal aortic aneurysm 40–50% of the time.

Popliteal aneurysms very rarely cause symptoms. They are typically discovered during routine examinations. The cause of these aneurysms is unknown, but they are more common in older people and men. Elective surgery is usually recommended for aneurysms over 20 mm in size.

== Signs and symptoms ==
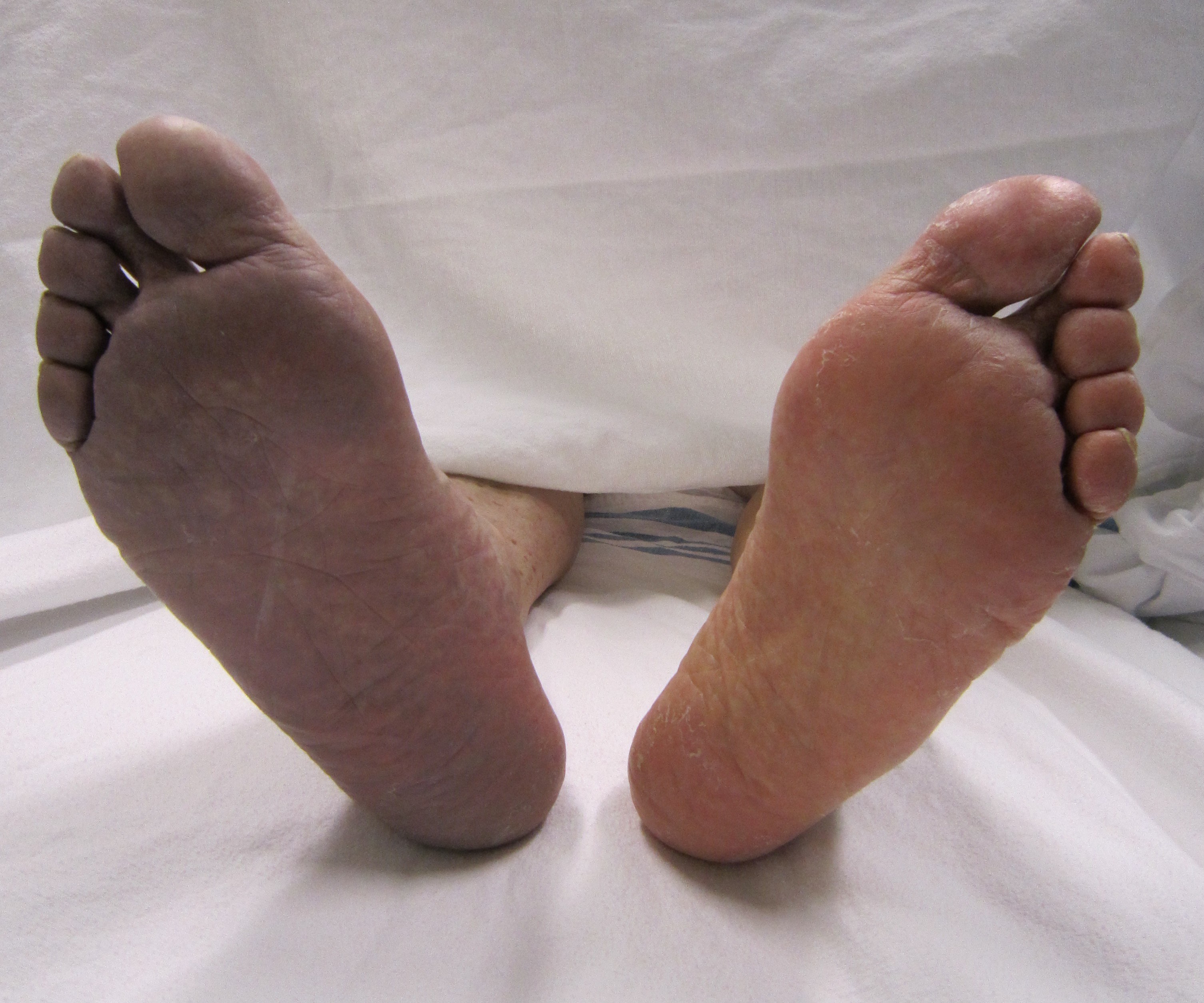
Acute limb ischemia is a potential complication of popliteal artery aneurysms.

PAAs are most often asymptomatic. Chronic symptoms are most often caused by the mass effect resulting from the compression of nearby structures, such as pain and paresthesia due to tibial nerve compression and calf swelling due to compression of the popliteal vein.

Thrombosis within the aneurysm and subsequent luminal narrowing may result in claudication (pain while walking) of gradual onset. An acute thrombosis, completely obstructing blood flow at the side of the aneurysm or lodging distally as the vessel narrows, may lead to acute limb ischaemia and associated symptoms such as local pain, paresthesia, paleness, weakness, and inability to maintain temperature. Thrombotic occlusion of distal vessels may result in blue toe syndrome, and acrocyanosis. Untreated, some 30% of those affected develop acute thrombosis and distal embolization, risking potential limb loss. In cases with acute thrombosis/embolism, amputation rate is 15%.

== Causes ==
Although the exact causes behind popliteal aneurysms remain unknown and under speculation, several risk factors are known to predispose the development of a PAA, including: tobacco smoking, atherosclerosis, connective tissue disorders (such as Marfan syndrome or Ehlers–Danlos syndrome), advanced age (peaking in the 6th to 7th decade of life), male gender, White race, and a family history of aneurysm.

== Diagnosis ==
The popliteal fossa is to be examined bilaterally (on both sides) with the knee in a semi-flexed position. In some 60% of cases, the popliteal aneurysm presents as a palpable pulsatile mass at the level of the knee. Doppler ultrasonography is the preferred diagnostic method. CT angiography and MR angiography may also be employed.

=== Differential diagnosis ===
Similar conditions to PAAs include popliteal cysts, adventitial cysts, lymphadenopathy, and varicose veins.

== Management ==
The Society for Vascular Surgery recommends elective surgery for asymptomatic PAAs of at least 20 mm in diameter; there is weaker evidence for waiting until a size of 30 mm for patients with higher surgical risk. Screening for both a PAA on the other leg and for an abdominal aortic aneurysm is considered essential.

A 2019 systematic review was unsure whether endovascular aneurysm repair or open surgery is better for those with aneurysms that are not causing symptoms. Stenting, however, was associated with shorter hospital stays and operating times with moderate-certainty evidence.

== Prognosis ==
A PAA rarely presents with a size greater than 5 cm, as symptoms typically develop before the aneurysm reaches such a size. Unlike aneurysms elsewhere in the body, the typical course of PAAs is to embolize and produce ischaemia, rather than to progress to rupture.
