= Acute limb ischaemia =

Occurs when there is a sudden lack of blood flow to a limb

- Other names: Acute limb ischemia
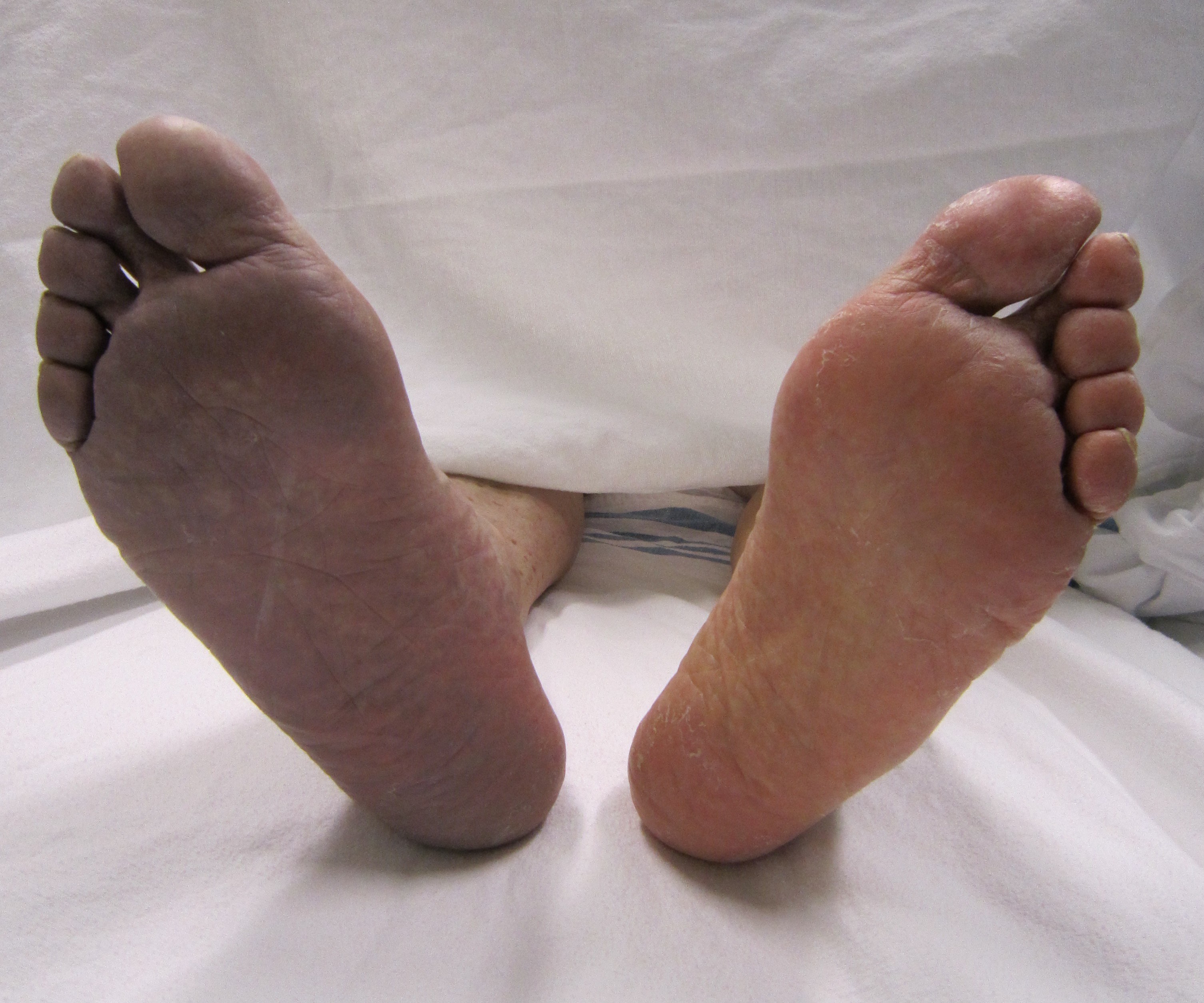
- Acute embolism to the right femoral artery resulting in ischemia
- Specialty: Emergency medicine, vascular surgery, interventional radiology
- Symptoms: Severe pain, coldness of the affected limb, paralysis, pins and needles sensation, pallor, pulselessness
- Causes: Embolism, thrombosis
- Treatment: Thrombectomy, thrombolysis
- Medication: Thrombolytic drugs

Acute limb ischaemia (ALI) occurs when there is a sudden lack of blood flow to a limb within 14 days of symptoms onset. On the other hand, when the symptoms exceed 14 days, it is called critical limb ischemia (CLI). CLI is the end stage of peripheral vascular disease where there is still some collateral circulation (alternate circulation pathways) that bring some blood flow (although inadequate) to the distal parts of the limbs. While limbs in both acute and chronic limb ischemia may be pulseless, a chronically ischemic limb is typically warm and pink due to a well-developed collateral artery network and does not need emergency intervention to avoid limb loss, whereas ALI is a vascular emergency.

Acute limb ischaemia is usually caused by embolism or thrombosis, or rarely by dissection or trauma. Thrombosis is usually caused by peripheral vascular disease (atherosclerotic disease that leads to blood vessel blockage), while an embolism is usually of cardiac origin. In the United States, ALI is estimated to occur in 14 out of every 100,000 people per year. With proper surgical care, acute limb ischaemia is a highly treatable condition; however, delayed treatment (beyond 6 to 12 hours) can result in permanent disability, amputation, and/or death. Early detection and steps towards fixing the problem with limb-sparing techniques can salvage the limb. Compartment syndrome is an occasional complication that may also occur in acute limb ischaemia because of the biotoxins that accumulate distal to the occlusion resulting in edema.

== Signs and symptoms ==
Symptoms of acute limb ischemia can occur anywhere from minutes to days.

The classic symptoms of acute limb ischaemia include:

- Pain - Usually starts distally in the extremity and will move proximally and increase in severity as ischemia worsens
- Pallor - The limb may appear pale and mottled
- Poikilothermia - Inability to maintain a constant core body temperature
- Pulselessness or severely reduced pulses
- Paresthesias - Abnormal sensations in the limb, which suggest dysfunction of nerves due to ischemia
- Paralysis - Indicative of advanced ischemia

These symptoms are called "the six P's"; they are commonly mis-attributed to compartment syndrome.

Symptoms may also include intermittent claudication or pain at rest. In late stages, paresthesia is replaced by anesthesia (numbness) due to death of nerve cells. In severe cases, gangrene can occur suddenly and spread rapidly, and should be treated within six hours of ischaemia.

Embolic occlusions should be considered when patients present with a sudden and severe onset. Acute arterial occlusions may also lead to arterial spasms, causing a "marble" white appearance. Patients who have an embolic (small piece of debris that breaks off from somewhere else in the body, such as the heart) cause of ALI often present with unilateral decreased pulses, whereas those with a thrombotic (clot that forms directly in the blood vessel) cause of ALI such as atherosclerosis often present with bilateral decreased pulses.

== Causes ==
Most acute limb ischemia is caused by thrombosis (40% of the cases), embolism (30%), vascular graft thrombosis (20%), thrombosis by popliteal artery aneurysm (5%), and major trauma (5%).

=== Risk factors ===
Risk factors include history of diabetes, coronary artery disease, tobacco use, atrial fibrillation, hypercoagulable disorders, autoimmune diseases, or diseases affecting connective tissues, such as Ehlers–Danlos syndrome. In a patient with otherwise no known risk factors, atrial fibrillation with embolism should be suspected.

=== Thrombosis ===
Thrombosis occurs when a blood clot forms within an artery, which can result from atherosclerosis or a hypercoagulable state. This leads to an occlusion of the artery and thus ischemia. Unlike embolic causes of limb ischemia, thrombosis is progressive and develops over time. In hypercoagulable states, thrombosis can occur in areas without atherosclerosis, and usually presents in patients with malignancy, increased tendency for blood to clot, or low blood flow.

=== Embolism ===
Common sources of emboli leading to arterial occlusions include thrombi from the heart or debris from the proximal aorta. As the emboli travel through the peripheral arteries, which are more narrow, the risk of occlusion increases. The arteries most commonly affected by emboli include the common femoral, common iliac, and popliteal artery bifurcations.

=== Vascular graft thrombosis ===
Thromboses as a result of cardiac interventions has become increasingly common. Clots may form at the sheath or catheter tip, potentially causing embolism during sheath removal.

=== Aneurysm ===
Thromboses forming within aneurysms are most frequently seen in the popliteal artery. Acute limb ischemia due to a popliteal artery aneurysm has been reported to have a 20-60% chance of limb loss and 12% mortality rate.

=== Trauma ===
Acute limb ischemia may also be caused by traumatic disruption of blood flow to a limb, which may present with either hard signs or soft signs of vascular injury. Hard signs include pulsatile bleeding, expanding hematomas (collections of blood), or absent distal pulses, and must be taken to surgery emergently. Soft signs include reduced pulses or nerve damage.

== Diagnosis ==
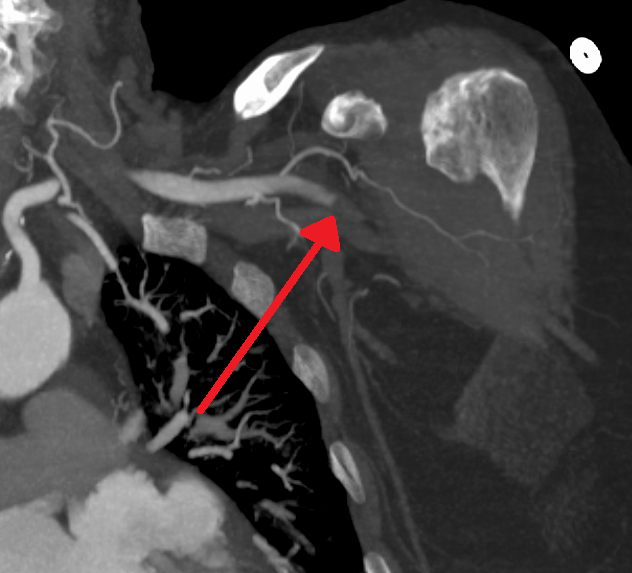
Acute occlusion of the axillary artery resulting in an ischemic limb as seen on CT angiography

Once signs and symptoms of acute limb ischemia are identified, the cause and location of the occlusion and its severity need to be addressed. A clinical pulse examination can be done to detect the location of the occlusion by finding the area where the pulse is detected until the area where the pulse disappears. The skin temperature would also be colder in the pulseless area compared to the areas where the pulses are present.

A Doppler evaluation is often the first imaging choice to diagnose ALI because it is inexpensive, accessible, non-invasive, and can be done in a short amount of time. It is used to show the extent and severity of the ischaemia by showing flow in smaller arteries. An occlusion of the artery would be seen by decreased or absent flow distal to the occlusion. Doppler ultrasound can even distinguish between embolic and thrombotic plaque. The former would show a delineated, round thrombus, whereas the latter would show narrowed arterial lumen with atherosclerotic plaque.

Although Doppler ultrasounds provide excellent information, there may be difficulty in evaluating aortic or iliac arteries in patients who are obese or have significant gas. Other diagnostical tools are duplex ultrasonography, computed tomography angiography (CTA), and magnetic resonance angiography (MRA). The CTA and MRA provide higher-resolution images used in planning revascularization, but they may only be used in patients without a threatened limb due to time constraints. CTA uses radiation and may not pick up on vessels for revascularization that are distal to the occlusion, but it is much quicker than MRA. In treating acute limb ischaemia, timing is everything.

Patients with clinical suspicion of ALI should also receive a chest X-ray and echocardiogram to evaluate for cardiac embolism, cardiac thrombus, myocardial infarction, and cardiac function.

The Rutherford classification scale is the most widely used system to determine prognosis and management strategy.

Rutherford classification for acute limb ischemia
Category	Description/Prognosis	Findings		Doppler signs	
		Sensory Loss	Muscle Weakness	Arterial	Venous
I. Viable	Not immediately threatened	None	None	Audible	Audible
IIa. Marginally Threatened	Salvageable if promptly treated	Minimal (toes) or none	None	Inaudible	Audible
IIb. Immediately Threatened	Salvageable with immediate revascularization	More than toes, associated rest pain	Mild or moderate	Inaudible	Audible
III. Irreversible	Major tissue loss or permanent nerve damage inevitable	Profound, anesthetic	Profound, paralysis	Inaudible	Inaudible

== Prevention ==
The primary prevention of acute limb ischemia starts with awareness of peripheral artery disease (PAD). In patients with PAD, smoking cessation, weight control, blood pressure control, diabetes control, physical activity, and rhythm control in those with atrial fibrillation should be encouraged. Lifestyle modifications such as exercise, healthy eating, weight management, and stress management are all important in decreasing inflammation and other risk factors for PAD. Medical therapy such as antihypertensives, lipid-lowering therapy, antidiabetic therapy, and antithrombotics can be considered when lifestyle modifications are not enough. Antiplatelets are recommended with 1C level of evidence for patients with symptomatic PAD, with a preference of clopidogrel over aspirin. The VIVA trial demonstrated a 7% reduction in mortality of using ankle-brachial index (ABI), blood pressure management, and ultrasonography for vascular disease screening.

== Treatment ==
Initial anticoagulation with heparin is usually first recommended to prevent further development of the clot and help reduce ischemia.

=== Considerations in treatment ===
The best course of treatment varies from case to case. The physician must take into account the details in the case before deciding on the appropriate treatment. No treatment is effective for every patient.

Treatment depends on many factors, including:

- Type of occlusion
- Location of lesions
- Anatomy of lesions
- Individual risk factors
- Procedural risk
- Clinical presentation of symptoms
- Duration of symptoms
- etc.

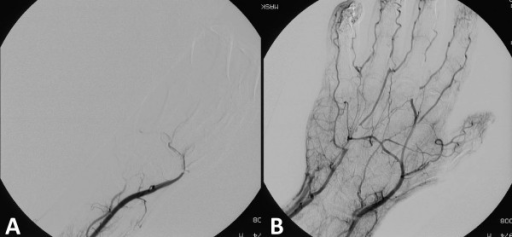
Angiograph before and after thrombolytic treatment of acute limb ischemia

=== Endovascular intervention ===
Endovascular interventions for ALI are minimally invasive procedures designed to quickly restore blood flow and avoid more extensive surgery. In endovascular interventions, a catheter is used to deliver medication such as thrombolytics to dissolve the clot. In the past, streptokinase was the main thrombolytic chemical. More recently, drugs such as tissue plasminogen activator, urokinase, and anistreplase have been used in their place. Mechanical methods of injecting the thrombolytic compounds have improved with the introduction of pulsed spray catheters—which allow for a greater opportunity for patients to avoid surgery. Pharmacological thrombolysis requires a catheter to be inserted into the affected area, attached to the catheter is often a wire with holes to allow for a wider dispersal area of the thrombolytic agent. These agents lyse the ischemia-causing thrombus quickly and effectively. However, the efficacy of thrombolytic treatment is limited by hemorrhagic complications. Plasma fibrinogen level has been proposed as a predictor of these hemorrhagic complications. However, based on a systematic review of the available literature until January 2016, the predictive value of plasma is unproven. After the clot has been dissolved or removed, a stent or balloon may be placed to keep the artery open and prevent further ischemia.

Major complications of thrombolysis include intracranial hemorrhage, major bleeding, compartment syndrome, and failure of thrombolysis.

=== Surgical management ===
Surgery is often recommended in those with Rutherford Class 2b or greater, as blood flow is generally restored much more quickly. The primary surgical intervention in acute limb ischaemia is emergency embolectomy using a Fogarty Catheter, providing the limb is still viable within the 4–6h timeframe. Other options include a vascular bypass to route blood flow around the clot.

=== Medical management ===
For secondary prevention of ALI, long-term anticoagulation and management of atherosclerosis must be considered.

== Prognosis ==
There is a high risk of mortality and cardiovascular events in those with critical limb ischemia. At one year, around 20–25% will die and 25–30% will need major amputation.

== Epidemiology ==
The major cause of acute limb ischaemia is arterial embolism (80%), while arterial thrombosis is responsible for 20% of cases. In rare instances, arterial aneurysm of the popliteal artery has been found to create a blood clot or embolism resulting in ischaemia.
