= Cirsoid aneurysm =

Medical condition

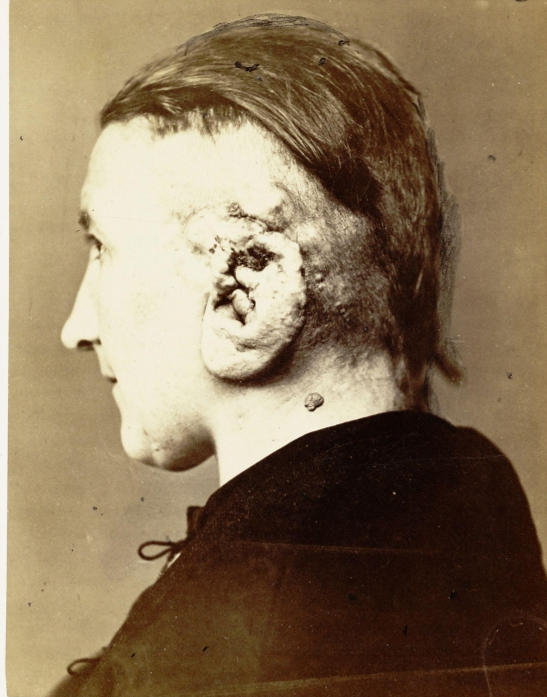
Cirsoid aneurysm of ear, 1872.

A cirsoid aneurysm, also referred to as an arteriovenous malformation is the dilation of a group of blood vessels due to congenital malformations with arterio venous (AV) shunting. "Cirsoid" means resembling a varix. They are most common on the head or neck.

Cirsoid aneurysms appear as nodules or papules. Histologically, they are composed of both thick- and thin-walled blood vessels.
