= Flow diverter =

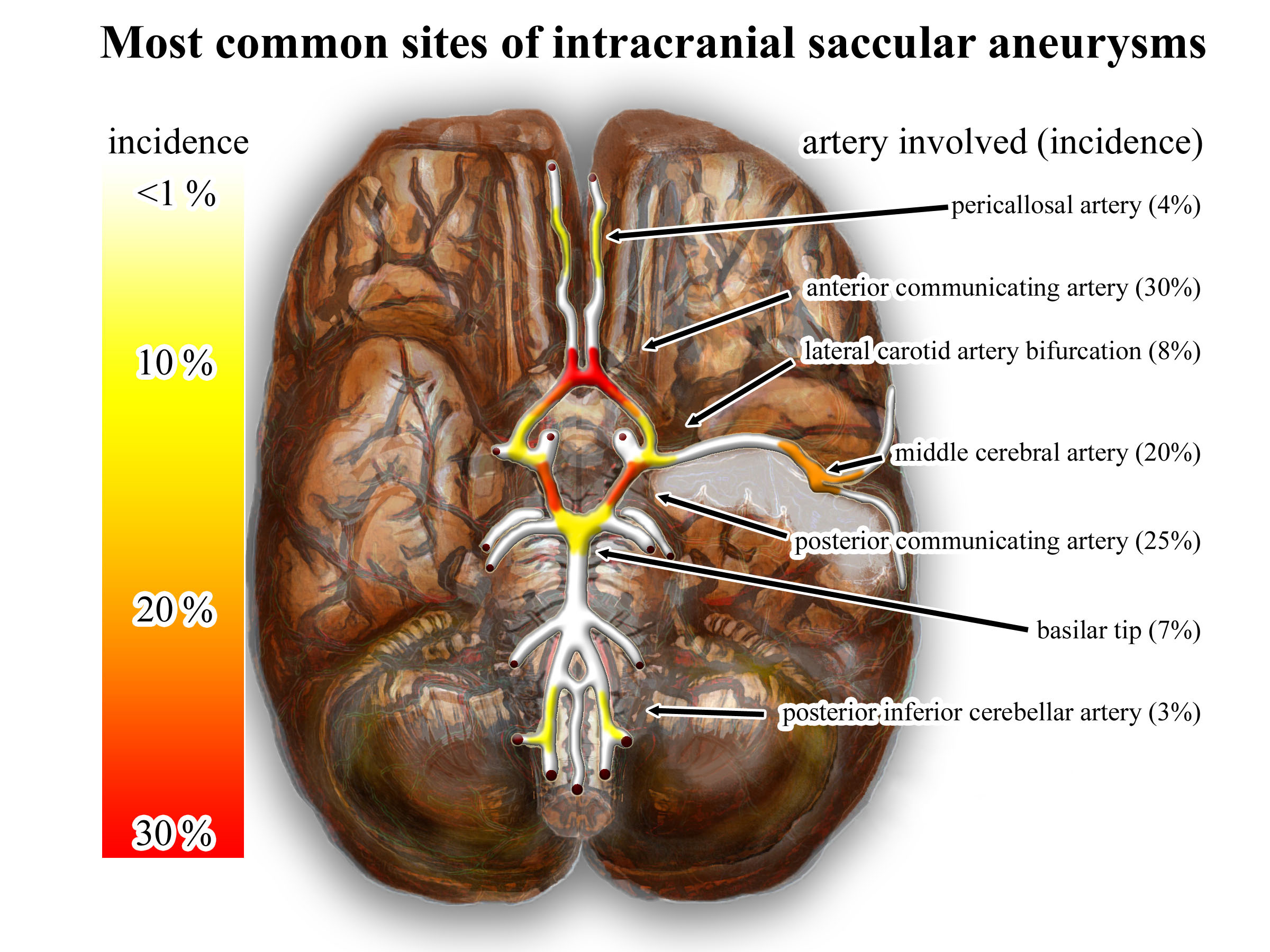
- Common sites (intracranial) of saccular aneurysms (treated with flow diverter)
- Specialty: Interventional neuroradiology
- ICD-10-PCS: Z95.828

A flow diverter is an endovascular prosthesis used to treat intracranial aneurysms. It is placed in the aneurysm's parent artery, covering the neck, in order to divert blood flow and determine a progressive thrombosis of the sac. Flow diverting stents consist of structural Cobalt-chrome or Nitinol alloy wires and often a set of radiopaque wires woven together in a flexible braid.

== Medical usage ==
Flow diverters are treatment for intracranial aneurysms alternative to endosaccular coil embolization, although the techniques can be combined, especially in large/giant aneurysms. It is mainly effective in wide neck unerupted saccular aneurysms, that are difficult to coil because of the tendency of the coils to fill the parent artery (referred to as prolapse). Another situation is fusiform shape or circumferential aneurysms. Prior to flow diverters many intracranial aneurysms went untreated. Flow diverters can be placed in the parent vessel or within the aneurysm, which are called intrasaccular flow diverters. These devices can be used to treat aneurysms by doing a cerebral angiogram via femoral artery or radial artery access.

== Risks and complications ==
The efficacy of flow diverters can be evaluated using a grading system developed by researchers at Oxford Neurovascular and Neuroradiology Research Unit (Kamran et al. 2011), commonly referred to as flow diverter grading system or Kamran grading system. After receiving a cerebral flow diverter, patients are placed on dual antiplatelet therapy for an extended period of time to reduce the likelihood of peri-procedural and post-procedural thromboembolic complications.

The degree of aneurysm occlusion is graded on a five-point scale from 0 (no change in the endoaneurysmal flow) to 4 (complete obliteration of the aneurysm). The patency status of the parent artery is evaluated on a three-point scale, from no change in the parent artery diameter to parent artery occlusion. This grading system is used in clinical practice. It has also been used and adapted by researchers to evaluate and report the effectiveness of flow diverters in general.

== See also ==
- Blood flow
- Interventional neuroradiology
- Intracranial aneurysm
