= Infectious intracranial aneurysm =

- Other names: Mycotic aneurysm
- Specialty: Infectious disease, neurosurgery

An infectious intracranial aneurysm (IIA, also called mycotic aneurysm) is a cerebral aneurysm that is caused by infection of the cerebral arterial wall.

== Signs and symptoms ==
Many patients with unruptured IIA may have no symptoms. In patients who do have symptoms these are often related to rupture of the aneurysm and to its cause. Rupture of an IIA results in subarachnoid hemorrhage, symptoms of which include headache, dizziness, seizures, altered mental status and focal neurological deficits.

In contrast to other cerebral aneurysms, large aneurysm size does not increase the chance of rupture. Small IIAs tend to have high rupture rates, while larger IIAs more commonly cause symptoms due to pressure on the surrounding brain tissue.

== Cause ==
Most IIAs are caused by bacterial infection, most commonly Staphylococcus aureus and Streptococcus species. In most cases the infection originates from left-sided bacterial endocarditis. Other common sources include cavernous sinus thrombosis, bacterial meningitis, poor dental hygiene and intravenous drug use. The use of the term infectious aneurysm by the above authors is incorrect. Refer to Holtzman RNN, Pile-Spellman JMD, Brust JCM, Hughes JEO, Dickinson PCT: Surgical Management of Intracranial Aneurysms Caused by Infection, in: Schmidek HH and Roberts DW(eds): Schmidek & Sweet Operative Neurosurgical Techniques: Indications, Methods, and Results ed.5. Philadelphia: Elsevier Inc. 2006 Vol 1: Chap. 87, pp1223-1259

== Diagnosis ==
Diagnosis of IIA is based on finding an intracranial aneurysm on vascular imaging in the presence of predisposing infectious conditions. Positive bacterial cultures from blood or the infected aneurysm wall itself may confirm the diagnosis, however blood cultures are often negative. Other supporting findings include leukocytosis, an elevated erythrocyte sedimentation rate and elevated C-reactive protein in blood.

=== Terminology ===
The term mycotic aneurysm, initially attributed to Osler and used to describe bacterial intracranial aneurysms, is a misnomer. Most investigators currently agree that its use should be strictly limited to descriptions of aneurysms of fungal origin. Yet efforts to establish an accurate nomenclature have been generally unsuccessful. Therefore, we are resigned to the fact that the term mycotic aneurysm will remain in general parlance. At the same time, we prefer the use of a more specific and accurate heading, namely, infected intracranial aneurysm, to include the categories of intracranial bacterial aneurysm, fungal aneurysm, spirochetal aneurysm, infested or amebic aneurysm, viral aneurysm and phytotic aneurysm, according to the specific infecting organism or agent. The terms infectious aneurysm and infective aneurysm are flawed because they imply that the aneurysm itself is the infecting agent rather than being the end point of an infecting process. Until such a pathogenesis has been detected, it is the intention of the authors to avoid catachresis and the application of archaic language (Marcus S, The George Delacorte Professor of English and Comparative Literature, Columbia University, New York, personal communication, 1993: "The correct usage is 'infected'. The term 'infectious' died out as a usage in termed of infected in 1726." And Jost, DA, former senior lexicographer of The American Heritage Dictionary, Boston, personal communication, 1996: "Infectious aneurysm will be interpreted by most users of English as an aneurysm that can communicate infection").

The term infected intracranial aneurysm lacks the properties of complete definition because it refers to the initial process that affects the arterial wall and to aneurysms found to have bacteria in their walls at the time of excision (Table 87-1, Patient 3; see Case Report 9, Fig. 87-9), but not to the processes of focal dilatation or subsequent aneurysm formation and enlargement. It also accurately describes the congenital or berry aneurysm that has become secondarily infected. The terms septic aneurysm and septic embolism and septic arteritis are also commonly used. However, the word septic refers to infection involving the blood stream and is not really descriptive of the aneurysm themselves.

== Treatment ==
Treatment depends on whether the aneurysm is ruptured and may involve a combination of antimicrobial drugs, surgery and/or endovascular treatment.

== Prognosis ==
Mortality of IIA is high, unruptured IIA are associated with a mortality reaching 30%, while ruptured IIA has a mortality of up to 80%. IIAs caused by fungal infections have a worse prognosis than those caused by bacterial infection.

== Epidemiology ==
IIAs are uncommon, accounting for 2.6% to 6% of all intracranial aneurysms in autopsy studies.
