= Adventitial cystic disease =

- Specialty: Cardiology

Adventitial cystic disease (also known as cystic adventitial disease CAD) is a rare type of non-atherosclerotic peripheral artery disease. It can present as claudication, critical limb ischemia or acute limb ischemia. The most commonly affected vessel is the popliteal artery. The cause is unknown.

== Diagnosis ==
The definitive diagnosis comes from pathological evaluation of the affected vessel, however adventitial cystic disease can be suspected based on imaging of the affected vessel using CT scan, MRI or angiography. If suspected at the time of angiography, intravascular ultrasound is of use in making the diagnosis.

== Treatment ==
Definitive treatment is resection with or without reconstruction of the affected vessel. Symptoms can be temporarily improved by cyst aspiration.
