= Infrapatellar fat pad =

Cylindrical piece of fat in the knee

- Cross section of the human knee

Details

Identifiers
- Latin: Corpus adiposum infrapatellare
- TA98: A03.6.08.018
- TA2: 1908
- FMA: 58772

The infrapatellar fat pad (Hoffa's fat pad) is a cylindrical piece of fat that is situated inferior and posterior to the patella bone within the knee, intervening between the patellar ligament and synovial fold of the knee joint.

== Clinical significance ==
The fat pad is a normal structure but it can sometimes become a problem:

- It can become damaged and painful
- It can be deliberately removed at arthroscopic surgery to make it easier for the surgeon to see what they are doing - but this can also lead to scarring and pain.
- It can become hypertrophic and may become impinged between the patella and the femoral condyle, causing sharp pain when the leg is extended. This is called infrapatellar fat pad syndrome or Hoffa syndrome.
- It can become involved in the process of arthrofibrosis and become scarred (fibrotic) and contracted, pulling the patella down into an abnormally low position.
