= Cardiovascular agents =

Drugs for heart or blood vessels diseases

Cardiovascular agents are drugs used to treat diseases associated with the heart or blood vessels. These medications are available for purchase only with a physician's prescription. They include, but are not limited to, drugs that target hypertension (antihypertensives), hyperlipidemia (antihyperlipidemics) and blood clotting (blood-thinners) to reduce the risk of cardiovascular diseases.

Antihypertensive agents are classified according to their mechanism of actions. The most common classes prescribed are diuretics, angiotensin-converting enzyme inhibitors (ACEIs), angiotensin II receptor blockers (ARBs), calcium channel blockers (CCBs) and beta-blockers.

Antihyperlipidemic agents most often prescribed are statins, ezetimibe and fibrates. They either lower low-density lipoprotein cholesterol (LDL-C) or triglyceride (TG) levels in blood to manage hypercholesterolaemia.

Blood-thinning agents, particularly antiplatelets and anticoagulants, maintain smooth blood flow by preventing blood clot formation in blood vessels. Two main categories of antiplatelets are COX-1 inhibitors and ADP receptor inhibitors, while anticoagulants include vitamin K antagonists, direct oral anticoagulants (DOACs) and indirect thrombin inhibitors.

Since cardiovascular agents have narrow therapeutic windows, a slight rise in dose may result in severe toxicity. Hence, monitoring at baseline and during therapy is needed. For drug overdose, stabilisation and antidotes help lower drug concentrations.

== Terminology ==
Cardiovascular agents are drugs that affect the rate and intensity of cardiac contraction, blood vessel diameters, blood volume, blood clotting and blood cholesterol levels. They are indicated to treat diseases related to the heart or the vascular system (blood vessels), such as hypertension, hyperlipidemia, coagulation disorders, heart failure and coronary artery disease. These drugs are prescription-only medicines, meaning that they should be administered strictly under a doctor's instruction and can only be obtained by means of a doctor's prescription.

== Drug classes ==
=== Antihypertensive agents ===
Antihypertensive agents comprise multiple classes of compounds that are intended to manage hypertension (high blood pressure). Antihypertensive therapy aims to maintain a blood pressure goal of <140/90 mmHg in all patients, as well as to prevent the progression or recurrence of cardiovascular diseases (CVD) in hypertensive patients with established CVD. An optimal blood pressure control is essential to prevent target-organ damage associated with complications of hypertension such as heart failure, ischemic heart diseases, stroke, and renal failure, ultimately reducing the risk of premature mortality. Antihypertensives are classified by different mechanisms or sites of action. Some of the most commonly used drugs to treat hypertension include diuretics, angiotensin-converting enzyme inhibitors (ACEI), angiotensin II receptor blockers (ARBs), calcium channel blockers (CCBs), and beta-blockers.

==== Diuretics ====
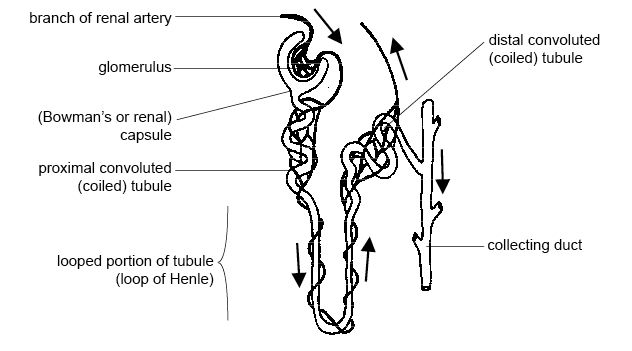
A picture showing the sites of action of diuretics in the renal tubule.

Diuretics act primarily by reducing the reabsorption of sodium at different sites of the renal tubular system and consequently promoting the elimination of sodium and water with increased urine output.

- Loop diuretics: furosemide, bumetanide, torsemide, ethacrynic acid
- Thiazide diuretics: chlorothiazide, hydrochlorothiazide
- Thiazide-like diuretics: metolazone, indapamide, chlorthalidone
- Potassium-sparing diuretics: amiloride, triamterene, spironolactone, eplerenone

For loop diuretics, thiazide diuretics and thiazide-like diuretics, their common side effects include hypokalemia, hyponatremia, metabolic alkalosis and hyperglycaemia. For potassium-sparing diuretics, its common side effects include hyponatremia, hyperkalemia, metabolic acidosis and sexual dysfunction specifically for spironolactone.

The use of diuretics should be avoided in patients with severe dehydration, anuria (absence of urine production). Diuretics are contraindicated in cases of severe electrolyte abnormalities and should not be administered until an electrolyte balance is restored. Special attention should be given to the use of thiazide and loop diuretics as they may exacerbate diabetes and gout.

==== Angiotensin-converting-enzyme inhibitors (ACEI) ====
Angiotensin-converting-enzyme inhibitors (ACEI) block the conversion of angiotensin I to angiotensin II by inhibiting the action of angiotensin-converting-enzyme, causing the reduction of blood volume and peripheral vascular resistance.

- Captopril, enalapril, lisinopril, benazepril, fosinopril, ramipril, perindopril

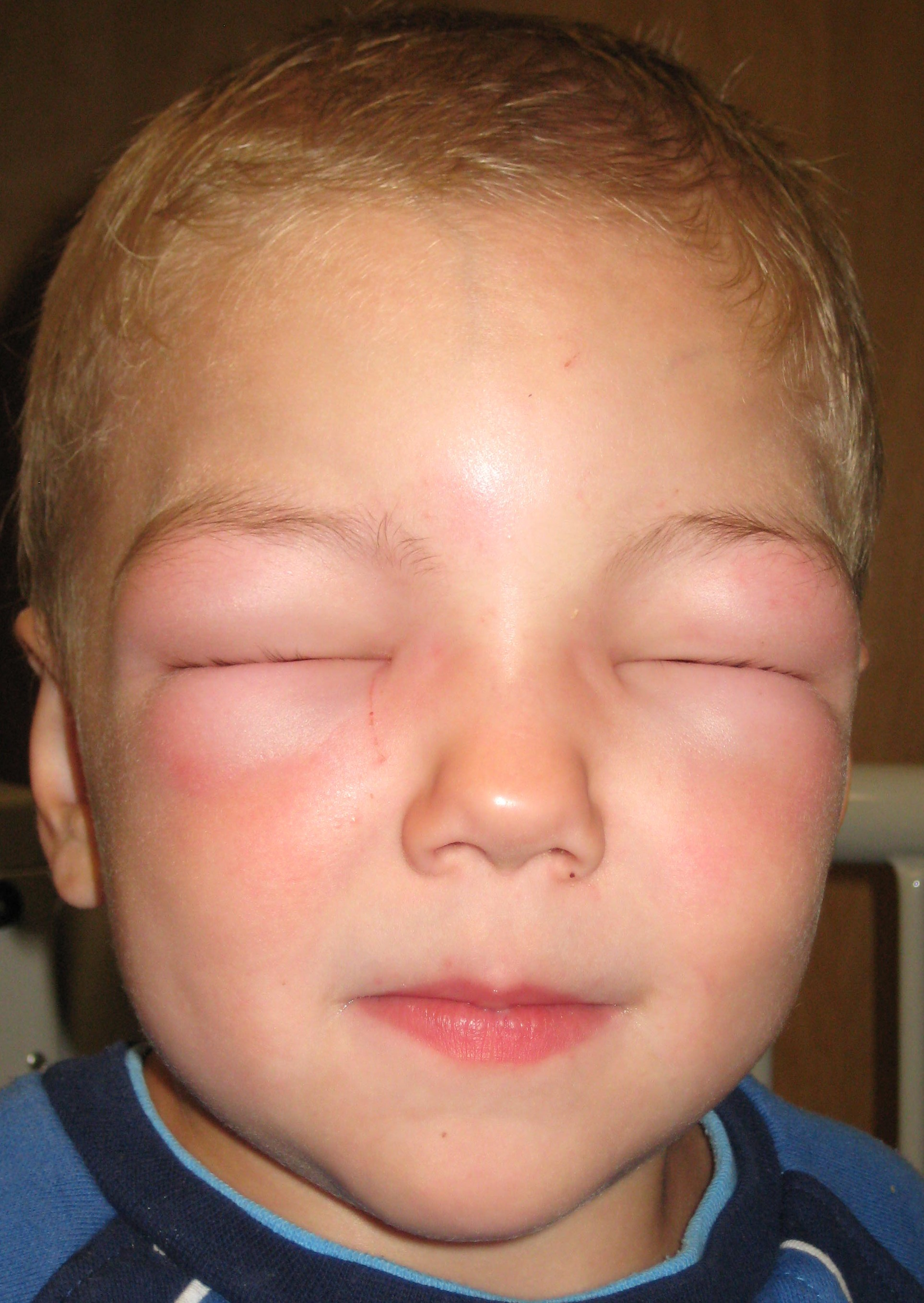
Angioedema, one of the rare side effects of ACEI and ARB.

Some side effects of ACEI include hypotension, renal insufficiency, and hyperkalemia. Dry cough is also a common side effect believed to be associated with decreased bradykinin breakdown. Angioedema is another possible but rare complication due to elevated levels of bradykinin.

ACEI should not be used in combinations with angiotensin II receptor blockers (ARBs) or direct renin inhibitors and is contraindicated in people with a history of angioedema and pregnancy. The concurrent use of an ACEI with diuretics and non-steroidal anti-inflammatory drugs (NSAIDs), is also contraindicated as this combination has been correlated with an increased risk of acute kidney injury. ACEI should be used with caution in patients with renal impairment, and renal failure risk in severe bilateral renal stenosis.

==== Angiotensin II receptor blockers (ARBs) ====
Angiotensin II receptor blockers (ARBs) work by inhibiting the action of angiotensin II on, specifically AT1 receptors to prevent the vasoconstrictor effects of this receptor and block the peripheral sympathetic activity.

- Azilsartan, candesartan, eprosartan, irbesartan, olmesartan, telmisartan, valsartan

ARBs are generally well-tolerated, in which they are less likely to cause cough or angioedema compared to ACEI. Common side effects include hypotension, renal insufficiency, and hyperkalemia.

The contraindications of ARBs are similar to those of ACEI, including the contraindicated combinations with ACEI or direct renin inhibitors, "triple whammy" (the concurrent use of an ARB with diuretics and NSAIDs) and in patients with a history of angioedema and pregnancy. In addition, ARB should be used with caution in patients with renal impairment and renal failure risk in severe bilateral renal stenosis

==== Calcium channel blockers (CCBs) ====
Calcium channel blockers (CCBs) preferentially block the L-type voltage-gated calcium channels to prevent the flow of calcium influx in the blood vessels and the heart, thereby reducing peripheral vascular resistance and cardiac output respectively.

- Dihydropyridines (DHP): amlodipine, nifedipine, felodipine, nicardipine
- Non-dihydropyridines (non-DHP): diltiazem, verapamil

In general, the side effects of CCBs include peripheral edema and gingival hyperplasia when CCBs are used chronically. To add on, DHP may cause reflex tachycardia and peripheral edema, while non-DHP may cause bradycardia and worsening of cardiac function due to reduced cardiac contractility and cardiac conduction.

Non-dihydropyridines are contraindicated in patients with heart failure with reduced ejection fraction (HFrEF), and second- or third-degree atrioventricular block. Special attention should be given to the coadministration of non-DHP with beta-blockers or ivabradine due to the increased risk of bradycardia. Since both DHP and non-DHP are metabolized through the CYP3A4 system, grapefruit juice containing furanocoumarins (the potent inhibitors of the CYP3A4 enzyme) should be avoided.

==== Beta-blockers ====
Beta-blockers act as competitive antagonists that block the effects of catecholamines at beta-adrenergic receptor sites, resulting in reduced rate and force of contraction of the heart, as well as reduced peripheral vascular resistance.

- Non-selective beta-blockers: propranolol, nadolol, timolol
- Beta-1-selective beta-blockers: atenolol, bisoprolol, metoprolol, esmolol
- Beta-blockers with vasodilating effect: labetalol, carvedilol, nebivolol
- Beta-blockers with intrinsic sympathomimetic activity: acebutolol, pindolol

Some common side effects include increased airway resistance for non-selective beta-blockers, exacerbation of peripheral vascular diseases, and hypotension

Beta-blockers are contraindicated in patients with second- or third-degree atrioventricular block. In particular, beta-blockers with intrinsic sympathomimetic activity are contraindicated in patients with myocardial infarction, heart failure or severe bradycardia. Beta-blockers should be used with caution in patients with asthma or chronic obstructive pulmonary disease (COPD) due to bronchoconstriction, and in patients with diabetes mellitus (DM) due to masking of hypoglycaemia.

=== Antihyperlipidemic agents ===
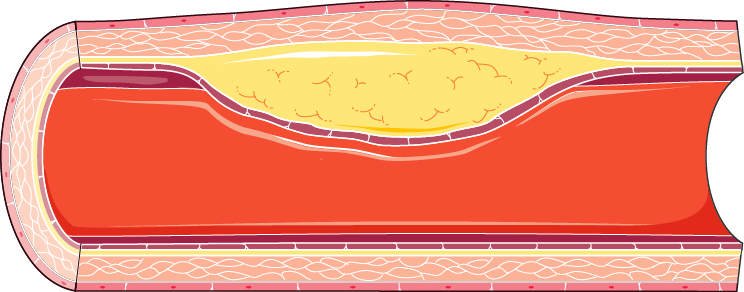
Formation of plaque (fatty deposit) in arterial wall.

Antihyperlipidemic agents are drugs used for the treatment of dyslipidemia, a condition of abnormal lipid levels in the body. It is characterised by elevations of low-density lipoprotein cholesterol (LDL-C) and triglycerides (TGs) in the blood. Hypercholesterolaemia induces the formation of plaques due to the buildup of excess cholesterol within the arterial wall. This increases the risk of, or aggravate, atherosclerotic cardiovascular disease (ASCVD). Therefore, antihyperlipidemic drugs are introduced for primary and secondary coronary heart disease prevention, as well as for reduction in mortality from acute coronary outcomes. These drugs include statins, ezetimibe and fibrates.

==== Statins ====
Statins, also known as beta-hydroxy-beta-methylglutaryl-Coenzyme A (HMG-CoA) reductase inhibitors, are the first-line drugs for hypercholesterolaemia. Examples of this drug class are atorvastatin, rosuvastatin, fluvastatin, simvastatin, pravastatin and lovastatin.

Most efficacious in lowering LDL-C levels, statins block the action of HMG-CoA reductase through competitive inhibition. HMG-CoA reductase, an enzyme found in hepatocytes, is responsible for the conversion of HMG-CoA to mevalonic acid for cholesterol biosynthesis. Inhibition of this enzyme reduces the synthesis and thus, availability of endogenous cholesterol. This reduction in intracellular cholesterol, in turn, causes an increase in the number of LDL receptors on hepatic cells. The elevation of LDL receptor expression decreases the plasma LDL-C level by promoting hepatic uptake of LDL from circulation.

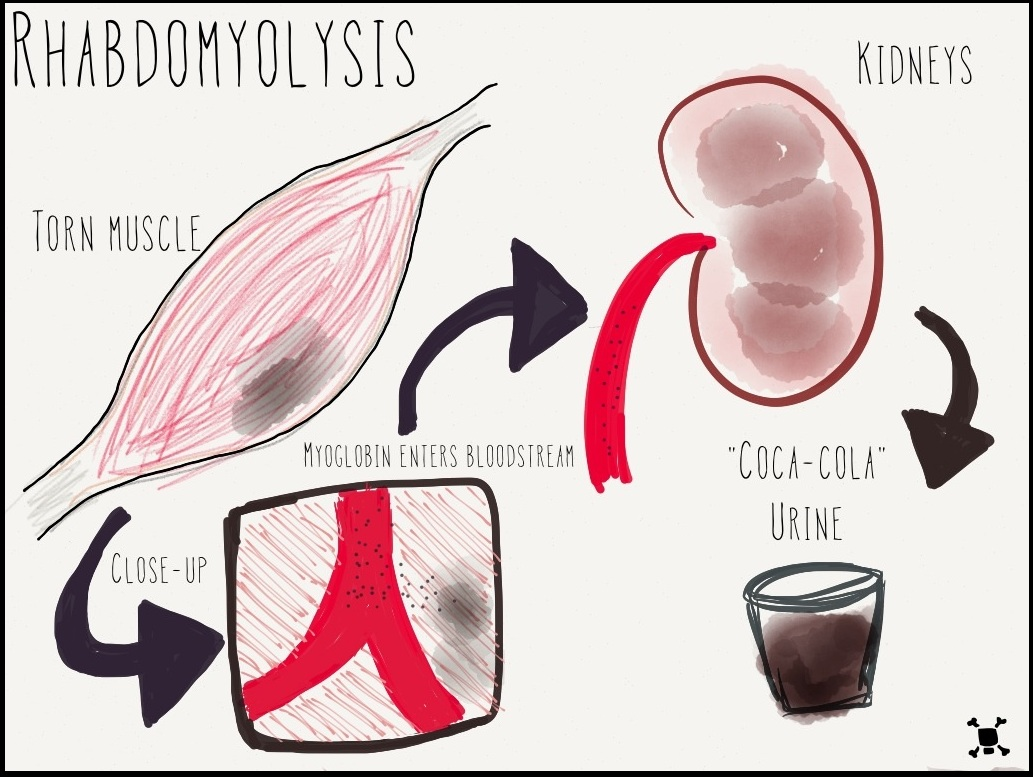
Clinical presentations of rhabdomyolysis.

While statins are generally well-tolerated, severe adverse effects such as hepatotoxicity and myotoxicity may occur in rarity. Statin-induced hepatotoxicity can cause autoimmune hepatitis and an elevation in serum levels of hepatic enzymes such as alanine aminotransferase, impairing liver function. Myotoxicity is commonly presented with statin-associated muscle symptoms (SAMS), which include myalgia and myositis. In rare cases, they may progress into rhabdomyolysis, a condition manifested by muscle necrosis and myoglobinuria due to heightened creatine kinase levels. Another consequence of taking statins is the risk of developing new-onset diabetes, which is more prominent in individuals with high TG levels and body mass index (BMI). However, the risk is far outweighed by the benefits from statin therapy for the reduction in cardiovascular outcomes.

Given the potential of statins to exacerbate liver and muscle abnormalities, contraindications of statins include decompensated liver cirrhosis, acute liver failure, unexplained and persistent elevations of serum transaminases, and myopathy. Moreover, statins are not recommended in pregnancy as they may cause foetal harm because of their mechanism of action.

Metabolised by the Cytochrome P450 (CYP450) enzyme, a major metabolic enzyme, simvastatin and lovastatin may accumulate in blood when administered with CYP450 inhibitors. Some of these inhibitors are azole antifungals, macrolides, CCBs, ticagrelor (antiplatelet) and grapefruit juice. Concomitant use of statins with CYP450 inhibitors, along with gemfibrozil (fibrate), increases the risk of myopathy. This is especially significant in patients under polypharmacy.

==== Ezetimibe ====
Ezetimibe is a selective cholesterol absorption inhibitor that inhibits the intestinal absorption of cholesterol by binding to the Niemann-Pick C1-Like 1 (NPC1L1) protein on the gastrointestinal epithelium. This reduces the delivery of cholesterol to the liver, which then induces the upregulation of LDL receptor expression, lowering hepatic cholesterol stores and enhancing clearance of circulating LDL. More often prescribed as second-line therapy for dyslipidemia, ezetimibe is used in individuals with statin intolerance or those who failed to achieve the target LDL-C level on statin monotherapy. In particular, ezetimibe and statin dual therapy have shown a 15% greater LDL-C decrease compared with same-dose statins alone, favouring recovery from acute coronary syndrome.

Whilst ezetimibe intolerance is uncommon, some reports have been made regarding gastrointestinal and musculoskeletal effects. Common adverse reactions of ezetimibe are nausea, abdominal pain, headache, fatigue, arthralgia, myalgia and hypersensitivity reactions. On rare occasions, ezetimibe may cause cholecystitis, pancreatitis, elevation of serum transaminase level and rhabdomyolysis.

As hepatic impairment hinders the rate of ezetimibe metabolism by the liver, ezetimibe is not recommended in individuals with moderate or severe hepatic insufficiency due to prolonged systemic exposure to the drug. In addition, similar to combined statin and fibrate intake, individuals should avoid the concurrent use of ezetimibe with gemfibrozil as it would increase ezetimibe concentration in the body.

==== Fibrates ====
Fibrates, known as derivatives of fibric acids, are peroxisome proliferator-activated receptor alpha (PPAR-α) agonists primarily used for lowering TG levels and management of atherogenic dyslipidemia. Typical drugs of the class include fenofibrate, bezafibrate, ciprofibrate and gemfibrozil.

Through activation of PPAR-α receptors, fibrates decreases circulating TG via upregulation of lipoprotein lipase (LPL) expression and downregulation of apolipoprotein C-III (ApoC-III) gene expression. LPL is a hepatic enzyme involved in lipolysis, whereas ApoC-III is an inhibitor of LPL.

Comparable to statins and ezetimibe, fibrates are usually well-tolerated with mild adverse reactions, with the exception of gemfibrozil. Some of the more prevalent side effects are minor gastrointestinal disturbances such as abdominal pain and cholithiasis on account of the increased excretion of biliary cholesterol. Among atypical adverse effects, myositis can occur in patients under gemfibrozil therapy, especially in those with renal insufficiency or under co-treatment with statins. In contrast, the risk of myopathy is much lower if fenofibrate is used in replacement of gemfibrozil owing to its different pharmacokinetic pathway. Other rare effects are increased serum transaminase levels, agranulocytosis and anaemia.

As fenofibrate possess the same binding mechanism as warfarin in the blood, this combination should be addressed with caution as fenofibrate may potentiate the anticoagulant effect of warfarin. Furthermore, fibrates are contraindicated in patients with active liver disease, severe renal impairment or pre-existing gallbladder disease, as well as in lactating mothers.

=== Blood-thinning agents ===
Thrombosis, occurs when blood clots form within blood vessels and limit the flow of blood.

Blood-thinning agents are divided into two groups, antiplatelet drugs and anticoagulants. They are indicated to facilitate smooth blood flow within blood vessels by preventing the formation of blood clots and retarding their growth. Blood clots are formed to prevent an injured blood vessel from excessive bleeding by a mechanism called hemostasis. The body has intrinsic mechanisms to dissolve the blood clot as the injury heals. However, it can be dangerous when clots do not dissolve naturally and develop within vessels, also known as thrombosis. Hence, blood-thinning medications can be prescribed to reduce the risk of cardiovascular diseases led by blood clots, such as myocardial infarction (heart attack), ischemic stroke, and venous thromboembolism. Haemorrhage (internal bleeding) is the most prominent side effect of blood-thinning therapy. Concomitant use of drugs that increase the risk of bleeding is not recommended. Meanwhile, patients should receive education about proper management of cuts, bruises and nosebleeds. The agents can be classified according to different mechanisms of action.

==== Antiplatelet drugs ====
Antiplatelet drugs inhibit blood cells called platelets from aggregating to form a clot.

===== COX-1 inhibitors =====
Potent antiplatelet medications that irreversibly inhibit the activity of cyclooxygenase (COX), an enzyme involved in the synthesis of thromboxane A_{2} (TXA2) which is responsible for platelet activation and aggregation. The major member of this class is aspirin. Some common adverse effects associated with this class of medications include bronchospasm and gastrointestinal disturbances such as dyspepsia and nausea. Therefore, this class of drugs should be used with caution in patients with a history of peptic ulcer disease.

===== ADP receptor inhibitors =====
Also known as P2Y12 receptor antagonists, they work by reversibly interacting with the P2Y12 receptor to inhibit the adenosine diphosphate (ADP) receptors on platelets, thus preventing the linkage of platelets by fibrinogen. ADP-induced platelet aggregation and activation are hence hindered. Examples include clopidogrel, prasugrel and ticagrelor. Clopidogrel has a common drug interaction with CYP2C19 inhibitors, particularly omeprazole and esomeprazole which are indicated for treatment of peptic ulcer and gastro-oesophageal reflux disease (GERD). As the activation of clopidogrel requires an enzyme called CYP2C19, its inhibitors should be avoided.

==== Anticoagulants ====
Anticoagulants are considered more aggressive than antiplatelet drugs. Anticoagulants work by interfering with various clotting factors to lengthen the time for coagulation. This can be achieved by either reducing the formation of bioactive clotting factors or accelerating the inactivation of clotting factors.

===== Vitamin K antagonists =====
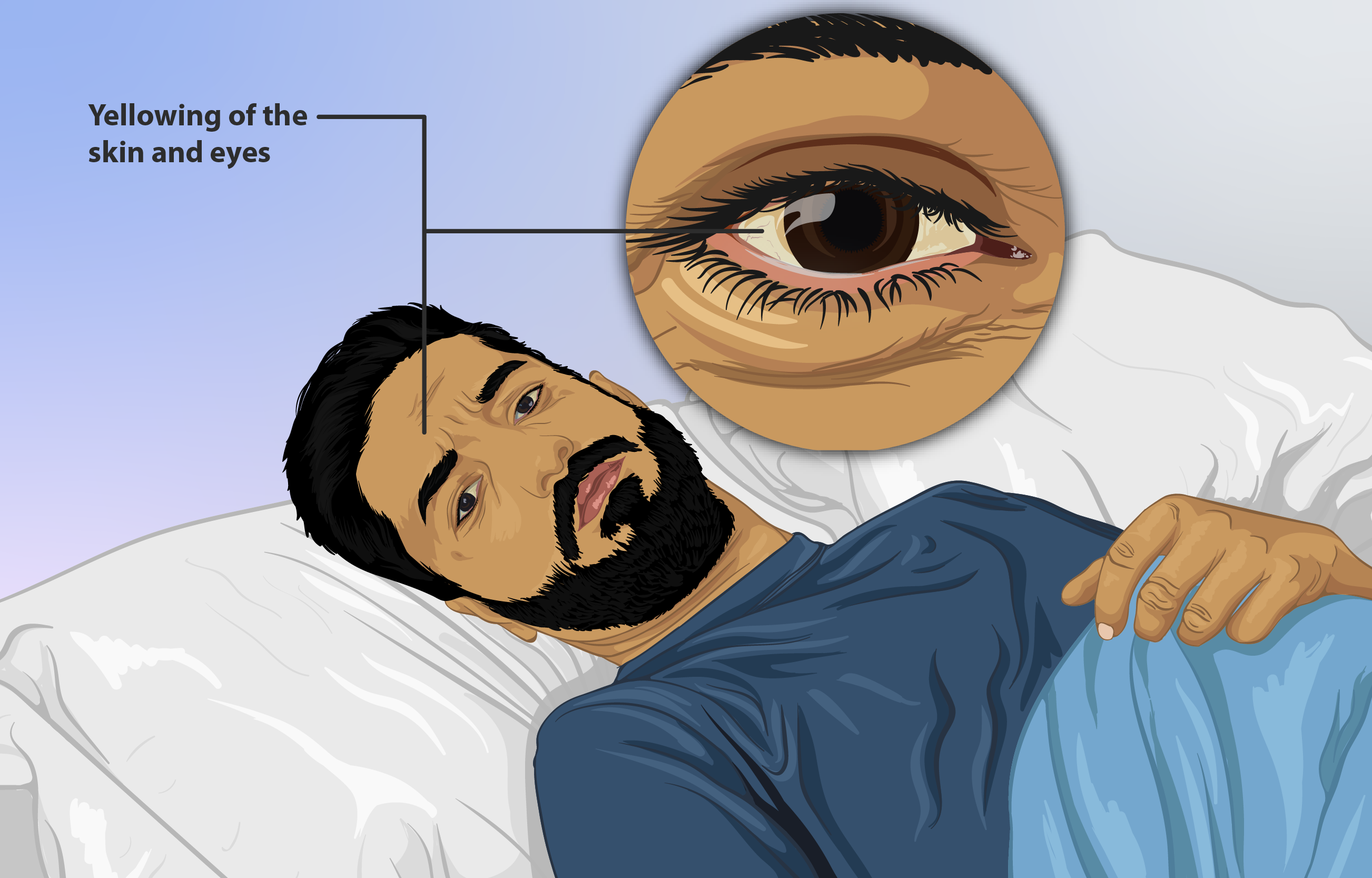
Jaundice, a common side effect caused by vitamin K antagonists.

Drugs that inhibit the formation of the vitamin K-dependent clotting factors and hence thrombin, an endogenous protein involved in the coagulation cascade. Vitamin K is an essential cofactor for the synthesis of clotting factors. By inhibiting vitamin K epoxide reductase, an enzyme for activating the vitamin K available in the body, the formation of bioactive clotting factors can be reduced. Although warfarin is commonly prescribed, it exhibits a delayed onset of action, which takes approximately 5 to 7 days to reach its full therapeutic effect. Apart from haemorrhage, jaundice (yellowing of the skin and eyes) is also a common side effect caused by this class of drug.

===== Direct oral anticoagulants (DOACs) =====
DOACs are agents that inhibit the formation of thrombin which is the central effector of coagulation derived from factor Xa. They are categorised into direct thrombin inhibitors and direct factor Xa inhibitors. Direct thrombin inhibitors bind to the active sites of free or clot-bound thrombin to inhibit its effects. Dabigatran etexilate is a common example which has a rapid onset of action. Whereas direct factor Xa inhibitors including apixaban and rivaroxaban directly bind to clotting factor Xa to block its activity, thus inhibiting thrombin formation. DOACs are advantageous over warfarin because of a wider therapeutic window, which indicates safer and more effective use with minimal adverse effects. DOACs also have more stable and predictable anticoagulation effects. Therefore, routine coagulation monitoring is not required.

===== Indirect thrombin inhibitors =====
Indirect thrombin inhibitors bind to antithrombin to enhance the rate of inactivation of clotting factors, indirectly inactivating thrombin through actions on antithrombin. Heparin is a widely used anticoagulant. It is administered intravenously (into a vein) or subcutaneously (below the skin). Heparin can exert an immediate anti-clotting effect which is useful for the treatment of acute symptoms. Besides, heparin therapy is indicated for anticoagulation during pregnancy as it does not cross the placenta and is not associated with fetal malformations.

== Drug overdose and management ==
Cardiovascular agents generally have narrow therapeutic indices, implying that small differences in dose or blood concentration may give rise to adverse drug reactions. Serious acute toxicity may result from accidental, intentional or iatrogenic overdose. Therefore, patients need to be aware of any unusual and serious side effects. Seek immediate medical attention if a drug overdose is suspected.

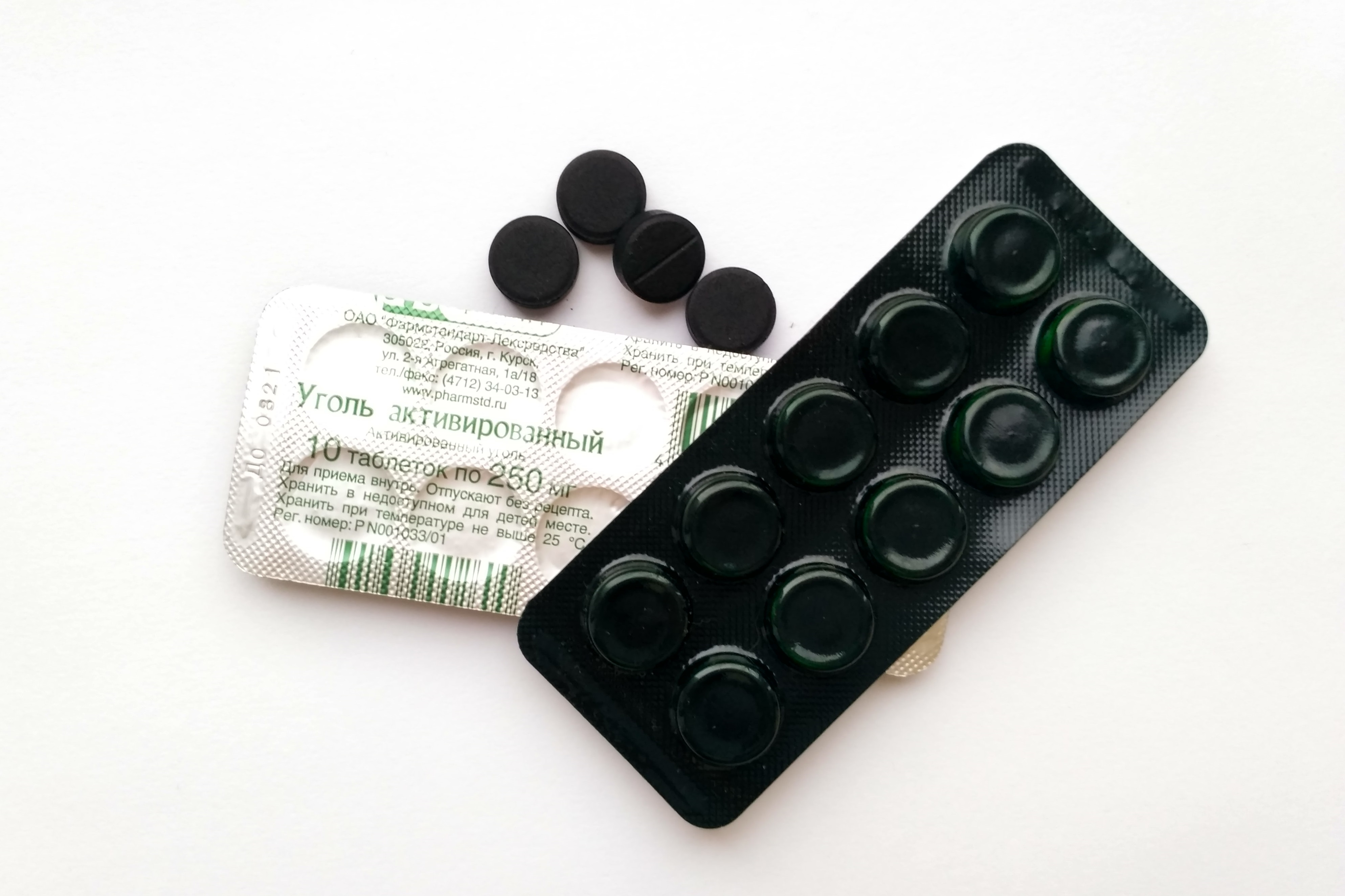
Activated charcoal tablet.

General management of acute poisoning requires stabilisation of the airway, breathing, and circulation. Supportive treatment to reduce further absorption of the drug is achievable by the administration of activated charcoal. Antidotes can be used to reverse effects of the overdosed medication if the exact poisoning agent is identified. However, only a few antidotes are available for cardiovascular medications.

| Drug class | Medication | Antidote |
|---|---|---|
| Antihypertensive agents | Beta-blockers | High-dose glucagon |
| | ACE inhibitors | Naloxone |
| | Calcium channel blockers (CCB) | Levosimendan |
| Blood-thinning agents | Heparin | Protamine sulfate |

Table 1: antidotes for cardiovascular agent overdose

For patients taking antihyperlipidemic agents, liver function tests have to be conducted before and during the therapy to monitor the elevation of liver enzymes which may result in hepatotoxicity, especially for those undergoing statin therapy. For patients taking blood-thinners, signs of severe bleeding should be monitored. The effect of aspirin can be life-threatening if taken over 150 mg/kg of body weight. The medication should be discontinued at the first sign of excessive bleeding.
