= Regrelor =

Chemical compound

Clinical data
- Drug class: antiplatelet drug

Identifiers
- IUPAC name: [(2S,3aR,4R,6R,6aR)-6-[6-(ethylcarbamoylamino)purin-9-yl]-2-[(E)-2-phenylethenyl]-3a,4,6,6a-tetrahydrofuro[4,3-d][1,3]dioxol-4-yl]methyl dihydrogen phosphate
- CAS Number: 787548-03-2
- PubChem CID: 11273179
- ChemSpider: 9448187
- UNII: Q6C8TY6SW1
- KEGG: D08983
- ChEMBL: ChEMBL261244
- CompTox Dashboard (EPA): DTXSID80229272

Chemical and physical data
- Formula: C_{22}H_{25}N_{6}O_{8}P
- Molar mass: 532.450 g·mol^{−1}
- 3D model (JSmol): Interactive image
- SMILES: CCNC(=O)NC1=NC=NC2=C1N=CN2C3C4C(C(O3)COP(=O)(O)O)OC(O4)C=CC5=CC=CC=C5
- InChI: InChI=1S/C22H25N6O8P/c1-2-23-22(29)27-19-16-20(25-11-24-19)28(12-26-16)21-18-17(14(34-21)10-33-37(30,31)32)35-15(36-18)9-8-13-6-4-3-5-7-13/h3-9,11-12,14-15,17-18,21H,2,10H2,1H3,(H2,30,31,32)(H2,23,24,25,27,29)/b9-8+/t14-,15+,17-,18-,21-/m1/s1; Key:NXHAXEBZOXCDKD-XIXRRVGJSA-N

Regrelor (also known as INS50589) is an experimental antiplatelet drug that was under investigation by Merck Sharp and Dohme in human clinical trials. Although it was initially found to be well tolerated in healthy subjects, safety concerns led to cessation of clinical trials.

== Medical uses ==
Regrelor is an experimental drug. It is classified as an antiplatelet medication. It was under investigation for use in blood clotting problems, as well as during coronary artery bypass surgery.

=== Available forms ===
Regrelor is available in an intravenous formulation.

== Pharmacology ==
Regrelor is classified as a purinergic P2 receptor (P2Y_{12}) antagonist. Other compounds in the same mechanistic class include clopidogrel and ticagrelor. It is characterized as a reversible, competitive receptor antagonist. The IC50 for antagonism of ADP-induced (P2Y_{12}-mediated) platelet aggregation was 16 nM in vitro.

Regrelor's primary metabolite is called INS51088.

== Chemistry ==
Regrelor is structurally similar to AMP, just like ticagrelor. Regrelor has 4 hydrogen bond donors and 11 acceptors. It is produced as a disodium salt. The two sodium atoms bind the negatively charged phosphate moiety in solution.

=== Synthesis ===
Regrelor was synthesized from adenosine diphosphate (ADP), an endogenous chemical involved in metabolism. The authors noted that the addition of a lipophilic moiety like cinnamaldehyde at the C-2' and C-3' positions, combined with ethylurea at N-6 on the adenine base, yielded regrelor.

== History ==
Regrelor was developed around the same time as prasugrel and cangrelor. After Inspire Pharmaceuticals initially developed the drug, it was purchased by Merck Sharp and Dohme.

== Research ==
Pre-clinical experiments in rats, dogs, and monkeys found that the drug acted quickly to inhibit platelet aggregation, and that baseline function was restored quickly after discontinuation of treatment.

In a phase 1 clinical trial sponsored by Merck Sharp and Dohme Corporation, regrelor was well tolerated in healthy volunteers. In 2008, phase 2 trials were discontinued. It is believed that further development of the drug was ceased due to safety reasons. In the trial, there was an increased risk of bleeding for patients on regrelor.
