= Bentracimab =

Medication

Monoclonal antibody
- Type: Fab fragment
- Source: Human
- Target: Ticagrelor, AR-C124910XX (the active metabolite)

Clinical data
- Other names: PB2452, MEDI2452
- Routes of administration: Intravenous infusion
- ATC code: None

Legal status
- Legal status: Investigational

Identifiers
- CAS Number: 2260568-31-6
- PubChem SID: 405226665
- DrugBank: DB16659
- UNII: 1TBM83QR9S
- KEGG: D11799

Chemical and physical data
- Formula: C_{2095}H_{3240}N_{560}O_{674}S_{12}
- Molar mass: 47440.93 g·mol^{−1}

Bentracimab is a monoclonal antibody medication which has been shown in phase one and two clinical trials to function as a reversal agent for the anti–blood clotting drug ticagrelor (which acts as a P2Y_{12} inhibitor and is sold under the brand name Brilinta among others). It is under investigation for use in major, life-threatening bleeding in patients being treated with ticagrelor. It is not commercially available.

== See also ==
- Other reversal agents for antithrombotic drugs
  - Andexanet alfa
  - Ciraparantag
  - Vitamin K
  - Idarucizumab
