= Triflusal =

Antiplatelet drug

Clinical data
- AHFS/Drugs.com: International Drug Names
- ATC code: B01AC18 (WHO)

Identifiers
- IUPAC name: 2-acetyloxy-4-(trifluoromethyl)benzoic acid
- CAS Number: 322-79-2
- PubChem CID: 9458
- DrugBank: DB08814
- ChemSpider: 9086
- UNII: 1Z0YFI05OO
- ChEMBL: ChEMBL1332032
- CompTox Dashboard (EPA): DTXSID8045305
- ECHA InfoCard: 100.005.726

Chemical and physical data
- Formula: C_{10}H_{7}F_{3}O_{4}
- Molar mass: 248.157 g·mol^{−1}
- 3D model (JSmol): Interactive image
- SMILES: CC(=O)Oc1cc(ccc1C(=O)O)C(F)(F)F
- InChI: InChI=1S/C10H7F3O4/c1-5(14)17-8-4-6(10(11,12)13)2-3-7(8)9(15)16/h2-4H,1H3,(H,15,16); Key:RMWVZGDJPAKBDE-UHFFFAOYSA-N

Triflusal is a platelet aggregation inhibitor that was discovered and developed in the Uriach Laboratories, and commercialised in Spain since 1981. Currently, it is available in 25 countries in Europe, Asia, Africa and America. It is a derivative of acetylsalicylic acid (ASA; Aspirin) in which a hydrogen atom on the benzene ring has been replaced by a trifluoromethyl group. Trade names include Disgren, Grendis, Aflen and Triflux.

Triflusal has multiple mechanisms of action that contribute to the effect of the drug. It is a COX-1 inhibitor. It also inhibits the activation of nuclear factor k-B, which in turn regulates the expression of the mRNA of the vascular cell adhesion molecule-1 needed for platelet aggregation. Additionally, Triflusal preserves vascular prostacyclin which yields an anti-platelet effect. Triflusal also blocks phosphodiesterase, increasing cAMP concentration as well as can increase nitric oxide synthesis in neutrophils.

== Mechanism of action ==
Triflusal is a selective platelet antiaggregant through;

- blocks cyclooxygenase, thereby inhibiting thromboxane A2, and thus preventing platelet aggregation
- preserves vascular prostacyclin, thus promoting anti-aggregant effect
- inhibits activation of nuclear factor kB, which regulates the expression of the mRNA of vascular cell adhesion molecule-1 needed for platelet aggregation
- blocks phosphodiesterase thereby increasing cAMP concentration, thereby promoting anti-aggregant effect due to inhibition of calcium mobilization
- increases nitric oxide synthesis in neutrophils

== Indication ==
Triflusal is indicated for;

- Prevention of cardiovascular events such as stroke
- Acute treatment of cerebral infarction, myocardial infarction
- Thromboprophylaxis due to atrial fibrillation

== Prevention of stroke ==
In the 2008, guidelines for stroke management from the European Stroke Organization, triflusal was for the first time recommended as lone therapy, as an alternative to acetylsalicylic acid (ASA)(Aspirin) plus dipyridamole, or clopidogrel alone for secondary prevention of atherothrombotic stroke. This recommendation was based on the double-blind, randomised TACIP and TAPIRSS trials, which found triflusal to be as effective as Aspirin (acetylsalicylic acid, ASA, which Triflusal is derived from) in preventing post-stroke vascular events, while having a more favourable safety profile.

== Pharmacokinetics ==
It is absorbed in the small intestine and its bio-availability ranges from 83% to 100%. The active metabolite of Triflusal is 2-hydroxy-4-trifluoromethyl-benzoic acid, which is when Triflusal gets metabolized by an esterase.
