= Homocysteine thiolactone =

Names
- IUPAC name (3S)-3-aminothiolan-2-one

Identifiers
CAS Number	2338-04-7
3D model (JSmol)	Interactive image
Beilstein Reference	80591
ChEBI	CHEBI:60315
ChEMBL	ChEMBL4078313
ChemSpider	118559
PubChem CID	134505
- InChI: InChI=1S/C4H7NOS/c5-3-1-2-7-4(3)6/h3H,1-2,5H2/t3-/m0/s1 Key: KIWQWJKWBHZMDT-VKHMYHEASA-N
- SMILES: C1CSC(=O)[C@H]1N

Properties
Chemical formula	C_{4}H_{7}NOS
Molar mass	117.17 g·mol^{−1}
- Except where otherwise noted, data are given for materials in their standard state (at 25 °C [77 °F], 100 kPa). Infobox references

Homocysteine thiolactone (HTL) is an organosulfur compound with the formula H_{2}NCHC(O)SCH_{2}CH_{2}. It is the thiolactone (intramolecular thioester) of homocysteine. It is produced by methionyl-tRNA synthetase in an error-editing reaction that prevents translational incorporation of homocysteine into proteins.

HTL can damage proteins through "homocysteinylation" of protein lysine residues. HTL has been reported to form isopeptide bonds with lysine residues in substrate proteins, a post-translational modification known as N-homocysteinylation (N-Hcy). This causes protein damage via a thiyl radical mechanism. The drugs citiolone and erdosteine are modified versions of homocysteine thiolactone.

When N-Hcy binds α-syn, it exacerbates α-syn aggregation, neurotoxicity, and dopaminergic neuronal degeneration. It also damages the protein DJ-1, contributing to Parkinson's disease.
