= Thienopyridine =

Class of chemical compounds

Ticlopidine

Clopidogrel

Prasugrel

Thienopyridines are a class of selective, irreversible ADP receptor/P2Y12 inhibitors used for their anti-platelet activity. They have a significant role in the management of cardiovascular disease.

== Clinical Uses ==
They are used in the management of peripheral artery disease, as well as the prevention of coronary stent thrombosis and strokes.

== Examples ==
Drugs in this class include: clopidogrel (Plavix), prasugrel (Effient), and ticlopidine (Ticlid).

Tinoridine was actually a predecessor to this work.

== Alternatives ==
Ticagrelor (Brilinta) is often listed with thienopyridine inhibitors and has similar indications for use but is not a thienopyridine. It is a cyclo-pentyltriazolo-pyrimidine that is distinct from the mechanism of the thienopyridines in that it reversibly (rather than irreversibly) inhibits the P2Y_{12} receptor.
