= Thiolactone =

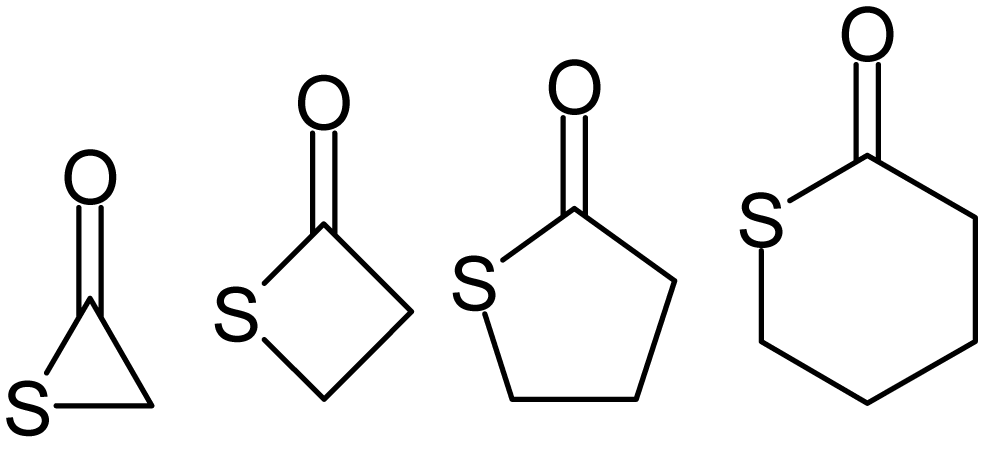
α-, β-, γ-, and δ-lactones (left to right)

Thiolactones are a class of heterocyclic compounds in organic chemistry. They are analogs of the more common lactones in which an oxygen atom is replaced with a sulfur atom. The sulfur atom is within the ring system and adjacent to a carbonyl group.

== Chemistry ==
Thiolactones can be prepared by dehydration of thiol-containing carboxylic acids. Thiolactones can be hydrolyzed back to the thiol acids under basic conditions. β-Thiolactones can be opened by reaction at the 4-position via S_{N}2 nucleophilic reactions.

== Occurrence ==
The activation of the drug clopidogrel (top left) gives a thiolactone, which ring-opens.

Thiolactones are intermediates in the activation of some drugs.

In nature, the most common thiolactone is homocysteine thiolactone. It is produced from homocysteine. It may play a role in protein damage. The drugs citiolone and erdosteine are modified versions of homocysteine thiolactone.

Thiolactones have been found in peptides synthesized by bacteria such as Staphylococcus aureus in order to regulate their quorum-sensing system.

== See also ==
- Lactone
- Lactam
