= Antiplatelet drug =

Class of pharmaceuticals

An antiplatelet drug (antiaggregant), also known as a platelet agglutination inhibitor or platelet aggregation inhibitor, is a member of a class of pharmaceuticals that decrease platelet aggregation and inhibit thrombus formation. They are effective in the arterial circulation where classical vitamin K antagonist anticoagulants have minimal effect.

Antiplatelet drugs are widely used in primary and secondary prevention of thrombotic disease, especially myocardial infarction and ischemic stroke.

Antiplatelet therapy with one or more of these drugs decreases the ability of blood clots to form by interfering with the platelet activation process in primary hemostasis. Antiplatelet drugs can reversibly or irreversibly inhibit the process involved in platelet activation resulting in decreased tendency of platelets to adhere to one another and to damaged blood vessels' endothelium.

== Choice ==
Antiplatelet medications are one of the primary recommendations for treatment of both stable and unstable ischemic heart disease. Most commonly, aspirin is used as a single medication (SAPT = single antiplatelet therapy) in cases of uncomplicated stable angina, and in some cases of unstable angina. If a patient does not tolerate aspirin, ADP/P2Y inhibitors may be used as single-drug therapy instead. More severe and complicated cases are treated with dual antiplatelet therapy, or in some cases triple therapy that includes direct oral anticoagulants. Clinicians must make a choice that balances patient risk with the increased risks of bleeding associated with combination therapy.

== Dual antiplatelet therapy ==
Often a combination of aspirin plus an ADP/P2Y inhibitor (such as clopidogrel, prasugrel, ticagrelor, or another) is used to obtain greater effectiveness than with either agent alone. This is known as "dual antiplatelet therapy" (or DAPT). DAPT is used in patients who have, or are at high risk of developing, unstable angina, NSTEMI myocardial infarctions, and other high-risk thrombotic conditions. Dual antiplatelet therapy has been found to significantly reduce rates of heart attacks, strokes, and overall cardiovascular death, but is not used in low-risk patients because it significantly increases the risks of major bleeding.

== Classification ==
Classes of antiplatelet drugs include:

- Adenosine diphosphate (ADP) receptor inhibitors
  - Cangrelor (Kengreal)
  - Clopidogrel (Plavix)
  - Prasugrel (Effient)
  - Ticagrelor (Brilinta)
  - Ticlopidine (Ticlid)
- Adenosine reuptake inhibitors
  - Dipyridamole (Persantine)
- Glycoprotein IIB/IIIA inhibitors (intravenous use only)
  - Abciximab (ReoPro)
  - Eptifibatide (Integrilin)
  - Tirofiban (Aggrastat)
- Irreversible cyclooxygenase inhibitors
  - Aspirin
  - Triflusal (Disgren)
- Phosphodiesterase inhibitors
  - Cilostazol (Pletaal)
- Protease-activated receptor-1 antagonists (which inhibit the protease-activated receptor 1 a.k.a. PAR-1)
  - Vorapaxar (Zontivity)
- Thromboxane inhibitors
  - Thromboxane receptor antagonists
    - Terutroban
  - Thromboxane synthase inhibitors

== Usage ==
=== Prevention and treatment of arterial thrombosis ===
Prevention and treatment of arterial thrombosis is essential in patients with certain medical conditions whereby the risk of thrombosis or thromboembolism may result in disastrous consequences such as heart attack, pulmonary embolism or stroke. Patients who require the use of antiplatelet drugs are: stroke with or without atrial fibrillation, any heart surgery (especially prosthetic replacement heart valve), Coronary Heart Disease such as stable angina, unstable angina and heart attack, patients with coronary stent, Peripheral Vascular Disease/Peripheral Arterial Disease and apical/ventricular/mural thrombus.

Treatment of established arterial thrombosis includes the use of antiplatelet drugs and thrombolytic therapy. Antiplatelet drugs alter the platelet activation at the site of vascular damage crucial to the development of arterial thrombosis.

- Aspirin and Triflusal irreversibly inhibits the enzyme COX, resulting in reduced platelet production of TXA_{2} (thromboxane – powerful vasoconstrictor that lowers cyclic AMP and initiates the platelet release reaction).
- Clopidogrel affects the ADP-dependent activation of IIb/IIIa complex
- Dipyridamole inhibits platelet phosphodiesterase, causing an increase in cyclic AMP with potentiation of the action of PGI_{2} – opposes actions of TXA_{2}
- Epoprostenol is a prostacyclin that is used to inhibit platelet aggregation during renal dialysis (with or without heparin) and is also used in primary pulmonary hypertension.
- Glycoprotein IIb/IIIa receptor antagonists block a receptor on the platelet for fibrinogen and von Willebrand factor. 3 classes:
  - Murine-human chimeric antibodies (e.g., abciximab)
  - Synthetic non-peptides (e.g., tirofiban)
  - Synthetic peptides (e.g., eptifibatide)

== Management in the perioperative period ==
Antiplatelet therapy may increase the risk of a bleed during surgery, however, stopping therapy may increase the risk of other thrombotic problems including myocardial infarction. When considering these medications and the risk-benefit ratio in the perioperative period, one must consider the risk of stopping the medication and a clot forming versus the risk of bleeding during or after the surgery if medication is continued. A 2018 Cochrane Review that included five randomized controlled trials found low-certainty evidence to suggest that continuing or discontinuing antiplatelet therapy for a non-cardiac surgery does not make a difference in mortality, major bleeds that require surgery, or ischaemic events. The same review found moderate certainty evidence that continuing or discontinuing therapy also did not have a big difference on the incidence of bleeds requiring a blood transfusion.

- Balloon angioplasty in the preoperative period – patients can proceed to surgery two weeks after the procedure.
- Bare metal stents required at least one month of DAPT
- CABG: Patients may proceed with surgery as soon as they are healed from the coronary artery bypass procedure and they do not need any specific amount of time on DAPT
- In patients with truly time-sensitive disease (defined in the 2014 ACC/AHA guidelines as needing to proceed in 2–6 weeks), DAPT can be stopped 3 (three) months (90 days) after a coronary stent is placed if postponing surgery any longer would result in significant morbidity. Examples of these types of surgeries include some cancer surgery and possibly some orthopedic surgery (non-urgent/emergent fracture management). Preferably 6 to 12 months of DAPT should be continued in patients having elective surgery.

== Dental management of patients on antiplatelet drugs ==
Dentists should be aware of the risk of prolonged bleeding time in patients taking antiplatelet drugs when planning dental treatments that are likely to cause bleeding. Therefore, it is important for dentists to know how to assess patient's bleeding risk and how to manage them.

=== Assess bleeding risk ===
Identify the likelihood and risk of dental treatment causing bleeding complications.

Dental procedures unlikely to cause bleeding	Dental procedures with low risk of post-operative bleeding complications	Dental procedures with high risk of post-operative bleeding complications
Local anaesthesia using aspirating syringe and vasoconstrictor	Simple extractions up to 3 teeth with restricted wound size	Extractions involving surgery, large wound or more than 3 teeth at once
Basic Periodontal examination (BPE)	Incision and drainage of intra-oral swellings	Flap raising procedures
Supragingival plaque, calculus, stain removal	Six point full periodontal examination	Gingival recontouring
Direct or indirect restoration with supragingival margins	Root surface debridement and subgingival scaling	Biopsies
Orthograde endodontics	Direct or indirect restorations with subgingival margins	
Prosthetic procedures		
Fitting and adjustment of orthodontic appliances.		

== Drug toxicity ==
Antiplatelet drugs effect may be affected by patient's medications, current medical conditions, food and supplements taken. Antiplatelet drugs effect may be increased or decreased. An increase in antiplatelet effect would increase the risk of bleeding and could cause prolonged or excessive bleeding. A decrease in antiplatelet effect would reduce the risk of bleeding, but increase the thromboembolic risk. Drug toxicity may increase when multiple antiplatelet drugs are used. Gastrointestinal bleeding is a common adverse event seen in many patients.

=== Medications ===
Medications that may increase antiplatelet drug effect:

- Cytotoxic drugs or drugs associated with bone marrow suppression (e.g.: leflunomide, hydroxychloroquine, adalimumab, infliximab, etanercept, sulfasalazine, penicillamine, gold, methotrexate, azathioprine, mycophenolate)
- Drugs affecting the nervous system (e.g.: Selective serotonin reuptake inhibitors (SSRIs))
- NSAIDS (e.g.: aspirin, ibuprofen, diclofenac, naproxen)
- Other anticoagulants or antiplatelet drugs

Medications that may decrease antiplatelet drug effect:

- Carbamazepine
- Erythromycin
- Fluconazole
- Omeprazole

Use of NSAIDs as part of dental management of patients with vascular disease should be discouraged as NSAIDs have antiplatelet effect. Instead, simple analgesics such as paracetamol or co-codamol should be of first choice. If NSAIDs are required, the risk of bleeding increases with duration of dental treatment.

=== Medical conditions ===
Medical conditions that may increase antiplatelet drugs' effect include:

Chronic kidney failure, liver disease, haematological malignancy, recent or current chemotherapy, advanced heart failure, mild forms of inherited bleeding disorders (e.g. haemophilia, Von Willebrand's disease) and idiopathic thrombocytopenic purpura.

=== Food and supplements ===
Food and supplements that may increase antiplatelet drugs' effect:

St. John's wort, ginkgo biloba, garlic.

== Oral antiplatelet drugs available in the UK ==
Oral Antiplatelet Drugs	UK Trade Name	Other Names (Non-UK)
Aspirin	Nu-Seals, Microprin, caprin Dual with dipyridamole: Asasantin Retard, Molita Modified Release	acetylsalicylic acid - There are numerous brand names for Aspirin
Clopidogrel	Plavix, Grepid	Iscover
Dipyridamole	Persantin, Persantin Retard, Attia Modified Release, Ofcram PR. Dual with aspirin: Asasantin Retard, Molita Modified Release	
Prasugrel	Efient	Effient, Prasita
Ticagrelor	Brilique	Brilinta, Possia

== See also ==
- Anticoagulant drug
- Nitrophorin
- Thrombolytic drug
