= Purinergic signalling =

Form of biological communication between cells

Purinergic signalling (or signaling: see American and British English differences) is a form of extracellular signalling mediated by purine nucleotides and nucleosides such as adenosine and ATP. It involves the activation of purinergic receptors in the cell and in nearby cells, thereby regulating cellular functions.

It was proposed after adenosine triphosphate (ATP) was identified in 1970 as the transmitter responsible for non-adrenergic, non-cholinergic neurotransmission. Nowadays, it is known that ATP acts as a co-transmitter in most, if not all, nerves in the central and peripheral nervous system.

Receptors for adenosine (called P1) and for ATP and ADP (called P2) were distinguished in 1978. Later, the P2 receptors were subdivided into P2X and P2Y families based on their different mechanisms. In the early 1990s, when the receptors to purines and pyrimidines were cloned and characterized, numerous subtypes of P1 and P2 receptors were discovered.

The purinergic signalling complex of a cell is sometimes referred to as the "purinome".

== Background ==
=== Evolutionary origins ===
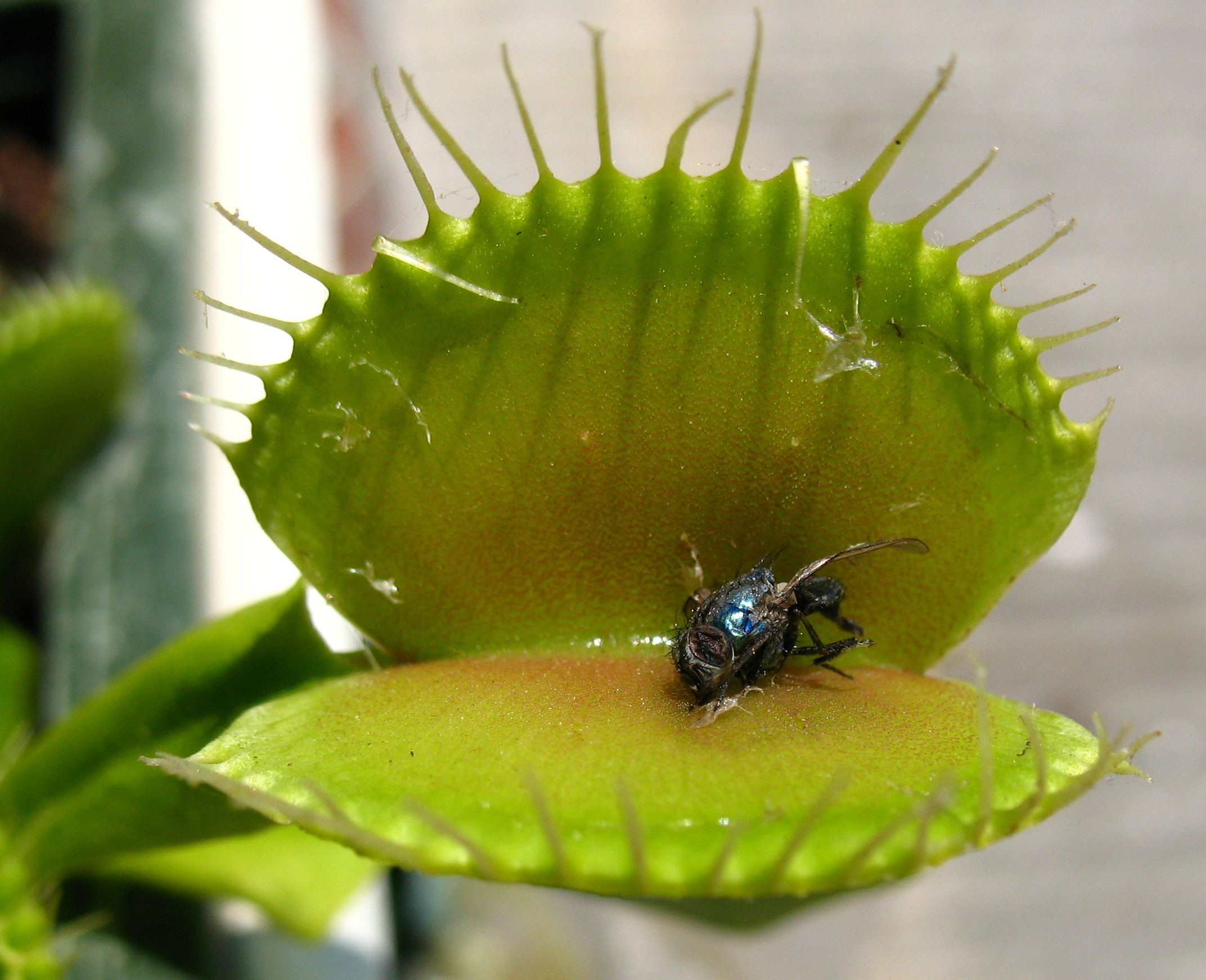
Exogenously applied ATP stimulates the closure of the Venus flytrap

Purinergic receptors, represented by several families, are among the most abundant receptors in living organisms and appeared early in evolution.

Among invertebrates, the purinergic signalling system has been found in bacteria, amoeba, ciliates, algae, fungi, sea anemones, ctenophores, platyhelminthes, nematodes, crustacea, molluscs, annelids, echinoderms, and insects. In green plants, extracellular ATP and other nucleotides induce an increase in the cytosolic concentration of calcium ions, in addition to other downstream changes that influence plant growth and modulate responses to stimuli. In 2014, the first purinergic receptor in plants, DORN1, was discovered.

The primitive P2X receptors of unicellular organisms often share low sequence similarity with those in mammals, yet they still retain micromolar sensitivity to ATP. The evolution of this receptor class is estimated to have occurred over a billion years ago.

=== Molecular mechanisms ===
Generally speaking, all cells have the ability to release nucleotides. In neuronal and neuroendocrinal cells, this mostly occurs via regulated exocytosis. Released nucleotides can be hydrolyzed extracellularly by a variety of cell surface-located enzymes referred to as ectonucleotidases. The purinergic signalling system consists of transporters, enzymes and receptors responsible for the synthesis, release, action, and extracellular inactivation of (primarily) ATP and its extracellular breakdown product adenosine. The signalling effects of uridine triphosphate (UTP) and uridine diphosphate (UDP) are generally comparable to those of ATP.

==== Purinergic receptors ====
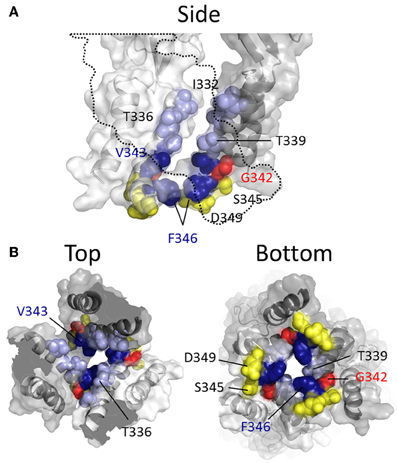
Homology modeling of the P2RX2 receptor in the open channel state

Purinergic receptors are specific classes of membrane receptors that mediate various physiological functions such as the relaxation of gut smooth muscle, as a response to the release of ATP or adenosine. There are three known distinct classes of purinergic receptors, known as P1, P2X, and P2Y receptors. Cell signalling events initiated by P1 and P2Y receptors have opposing effects in biological systems.

| Name | Activation | Class |
|---|---|---|
| P1 receptors | adenosine | G protein-coupled receptors |
| P2Y receptors | nucleotides: ATP; ADP; UTP; UDP; UDP-glucose | G protein-coupled receptors |
| P2X receptors | ATP | ligand-gated ion channel |

==== Nucleoside transporters ====
Nucleoside transporters (NTs) are a group of membrane transport proteins which transport nucleoside substrates including adenosine across the membranes of cells and/or vesicles. NTs are considered to be evolutionarily ancient membrane proteins and are found in many different forms of life. There are two types of NTs:

- Concentrative nucleoside transporters (CNTs): Na+-dependent symporters
- Equilibrative nucleoside transporters (ENTs): Na+-independent passive transporters

The extracellular concentration of adenosine can be regulated by NTs, possibly in the form of a feedback loop connecting receptor signaling with transporter function.

==== Ectonucleotidases ====
Released nucleotides can be hydrolyzed extracellularly by a variety of cell surface-located enzymes referred to as ectonucleotidases that control purinergic signalling. Extracellular nucleoside triphosphates and diphosphates are substrates of the ectonucleoside triphosphate diphosphohydrolases (E-NTPDases), the ectonucleotide pyrophosphatase/phosphodiesterases (E-NPPs) and alkaline phosphatases (APs). Extracellular AMP is hydrolyzed to adenosine by ecto-5'-nucleotidase (eN) as well as by APs. In any case, the final product of the hydrolysis cascade is the nucleoside.

==== Pannexins ====
The Pannexin-1 channel (PANX1) is an integral component of the P2X/P2Y purinergic signaling pathway and the key contributor to pathophysiological ATP release. For example, the PANX1 channel, along with ATP, purinergic receptors, and ectonucleotidases, contribute to several feedback loops during the inflammatory response.

== In humans ==
=== Circulatory system ===
In the human heart, adenosine functions as an autacoid in the regulation of various cardiac functions such as heart rate, contractility, and coronary flow. There are currently four types of adenosine receptors found in the heart. After binding onto a specific purinergic receptor, adenosine causes a negative chronotropic effect due to its influence on cardiac pacemakers. It also causes a negative dromotropic effect through the inhibition of AV-nodal conduction. From the 1980s onwards, these effects of adenosine have been used in the treatment of patients with supraventricular tachycardia.

The regulation of vascular tone in the endothelium of blood vessels is mediated by purinergic signalling. A decreased concentration of oxygen releases ATP from erythrocytes, triggering a propagated calcium wave in the endothelial layer of blood vessels and a subsequent production of nitric oxide that results in vasodilation.

During the blood clotting process, adenosine diphosphate (ADP) plays a crucial role in the activation and recruitment of platelets and also ensures the structural integrity of thrombi. These effects are modulated by the P2RY1 and the P2Y12 receptors. The P2RY1 receptor is responsible for shape change in platelets, increased intracellular calcium levels and transient platelet aggregation, while the P2Y12 receptor is responsible for sustained platelet aggregation through the inhibition of adenylate cyclase and a corresponding decrease in cyclic adenosine monophosphate (cAMP) levels. The activation of both purinergic receptors is necessary to achieve sustained hemostasis.

=== Digestive system ===
In the liver, ATP is constantly released during homeostasis and its signalling via P2 receptors influences bile secretion as well as liver metabolism and regeneration. P2Y receptors in the enteric nervous system and at intestinal neuromuscular junctions modulate intestinal secretion and motility.

=== Endocrine system ===
Cells of the pituitary gland secrete ATP, which acts on P2Y and P2X purinoreceptors.

=== Immune system ===
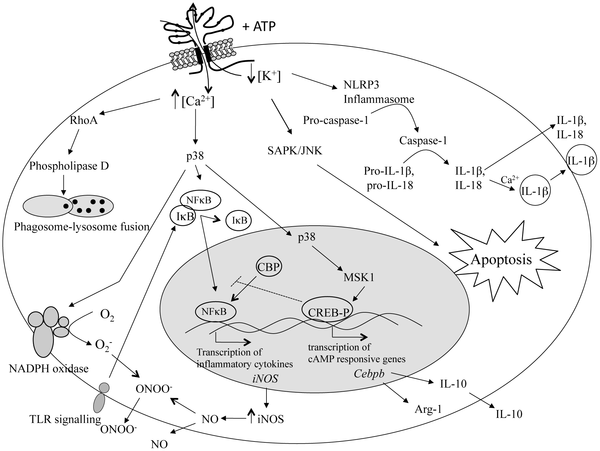
As part of the inflammatory response, ATP activates the P2RX7 receptor, triggering a drop in intracellular potassium levels and the formation of inflammasomes

Autocrine purinergic signalling is an important checkpoint in the activation of white blood cells. These mechanisms either enhance or inhibit cell activation based on the purinergic receptors involved, allowing cells to adjust their functional responses initiated by extracellular environmental cues.

Like most immunomodulating agents, ATP can act either as an immunosuppressive or an immunostimulatory factor, depending on the cytokine microenvironment and the type of cell receptor. In white blood cells such as macrophages, dendritic cells, lymphocytes, eosinophils, and mast cells, purinergic signalling plays a pathophysiological role in calcium mobilization, actin polymerization, release of mediators, cell maturation, cytotoxicity, and apoptosis. Large increases in extracellular ATP that are associated with cell death serve as a "danger signal" in the inflammatory processes.

In neutrophils, tissue adenosine can either activate or inhibit various neutrophil functions, depending on the inflammatory microenvironment, the expression of adenosine receptors on the neutrophil, and the affinity of these receptors for adenosine. Micromolar concentrations of adenosine activate A2A and A2B receptors. This inhibits the release of granules and prevents oxidative burst. On the other hand, nanomolar concentrations of adenosine activate A1 and A3 receptors, resulting in neutrophilic chemotaxis towards inflammatory stimuli. The release of ATP and an autocrine feedback through P2RY2 and A3 receptors are signal amplifiers. Hypoxia-inducible factors also influence adenosine signalling.

=== Nervous system ===
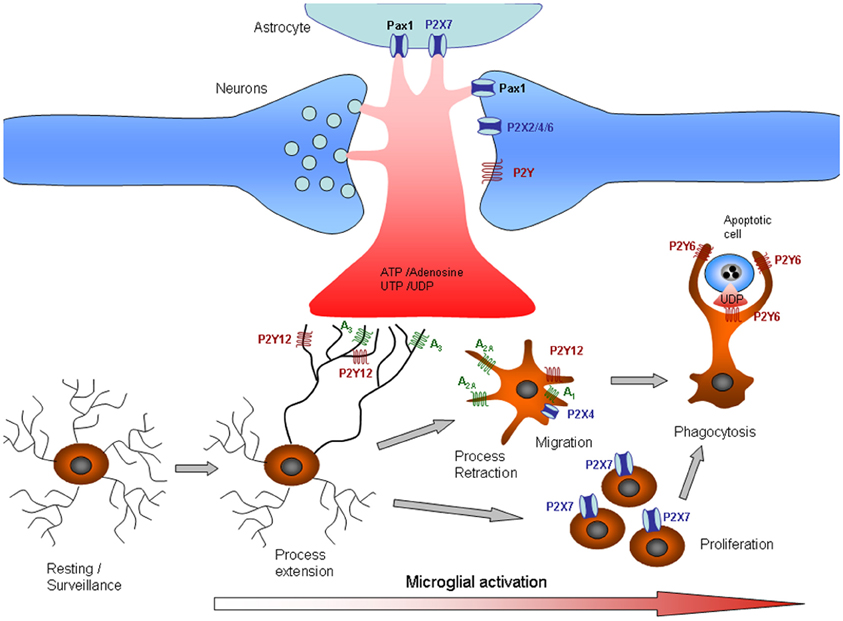
Microglial activation in the CNS via purinergic signalling

In the central nervous system (CNS), ATP is released from synaptic terminals and binds to a plethora of ionotropic and metabotropic receptors. It has an excitatory effect on neurones, and acts as a mediator in neuronal–glial communications. Both adenosine and ATP induce astrocyte cell proliferation. In microglia, P2X and P2Y receptors are expressed. The P2Y6 receptor, which is primarily mediated by uridine diphosphate (UDP), plays a significant role in microglial phagoptosis, while the P2Y12 receptor functions as a specialized pattern recognition receptor. P2RX4 receptors are involved in the CNS mediation of neuropathic pain.

In the peripheral nervous system, Schwann cells respond to nerve stimulation and modulate the release of neurotransmitters through mechanisms involving ATP and adenosine signalling. In the retina and the olfactory bulb, ATP is released by neurons to evoke transient calcium signals in several glial cells such as Muller glia and astrocytes. This influences various homeostatic processes of the nervous tissue including volume regulation and the control of blood flow. Although purinergic signaling has been connected to pathological processes in the context of neuron-glia communication, it has been revealed, that this is also very important under physiological conditions. Neurons possess specialised sites on their cell bodies, through which they release ATP (and other substances), reflecting their "well-being". Microglial processes specifically recognize these purinergic somatic-junctions, and monitor neuronal functions by sensing purine nucleotides via their P2Y12-receptors. In case of neuronal overactivation or injury, microglial processes respond with an increased coverage of neuronal cell bodies, and exert robust neuroprotective effects. These purinergic somatic-junctions have also been shown to be important for microglia to control neuronal development. Calcium signaling evoked by purinergic receptors contributes to the processing of sensory information.

During neurogenesis and in early brain development, ectonucleotidases often downregulate purinergic signalling in order to prevent the uncontrolled growth of progenitor cells and to establish a suitable environment for neuronal differentiation.

Purinergic signalling, and in particular tissue-injury induced ATP-release is very important for the rapid and robust phenotype changes of microglia.

=== Renal system ===
In the kidneys, the glomerular filtration rate (GFR) is regulated by several mechanisms including tubuloglomerular feedback (TGF), in which an increased distal tubular sodium chloride concentration causes a basolateral release of ATP from the macula densa cells. This initiates a cascade of events that ultimately brings GFR to an appropriate level.

=== Respiratory system ===
ATP and adenosine are crucial regulators of mucociliary clearance. The secretion of mucin involves P2RY2 receptors found on the apical membrane of goblet cells. Extracellular ATP signals acting on glial cells and the neurons of the respiratory rhythm generator contribute to the regulation of breathing.

=== Skeletal system ===
In the human skeleton, nearly all P2Y and P2X receptors have been found in osteoblasts and osteoclasts. These receptors enable the regulation of multiple processes such as cell proliferation, differentiation, function, and death. The activation of the adenosine A1 receptor is required for osteoclast differentiation and function, whereas the activation of the adenosine A2A receptor inhibits osteoclast function. The other three adenosine receptors are involved in bone formation.

== Pathological aspects ==
=== Alzheimer's disease ===
In Alzheimer's disease (AD), the expression of A1 and A2A receptors in the frontal cortex of the human brain is increased, while the expression of A1 receptors in the outer layers of hippocampal dentate gyrus is decreased.

=== Asthma ===
In the airways of patients with asthma, the expression of adenosine receptors is upregulated. Adenosine receptors affect bronchial reactivity, endothelial permeability, fibrosis, angiogenesis and mucus production.

=== Autism ===
Various preclinical studies have revealed that the dysregulation of purinergic pathways contributes significantly to neuroinflammation, persistent synaptic abnormalities, disrupted glial communication, and behavioral changes associated with autism-like traits.

=== Bone diseases ===
Purinergic signalling is involved in the pathophysiology of several bone and cartilage diseases such as osteoarthritis, rheumatoid arthritis, and osteoporosis. Single-nucleotide polymorphisms (SNPs) in the P2RX7 receptor gene are associated with an increased risk of bone fracture.

=== Cancer ===
The P2RX7 receptor is overexpressed in most malignant tumors. The expression of the adenosine A2A receptor on endothelial cells is upregulated in the early stages of human lung cancer.

=== Cardiovascular diseases ===
Formation of foam cells is inhibited by adenosine A2A receptors.

=== Chronic obstructive pulmonary disease ===
Abnormal levels of ATP and adenosine are present in the airways of patients with chronic obstructive pulmonary disease.

=== Erectile disorders ===
The release of ATP increases adenosine levels and activates nitric oxide synthase, both of which induces the relaxation of the corpus cavernosum penis. In male patients with vasculogenic impotence, dysfunctional adenosine A2B receptors are associated with the resistance of the corpus cavernosum to adenosine. On the other hand, excess adenosine in penile tissue contributes to priapism.

=== Fibrosis ===
The bronchoalveolar lavage (BAL) fluid of patients with idiopathic pulmonary fibrosis contains a higher concentration of ATP than that of control subjects. Persistently elevated concentrations of adenosine beyond the acute-injury phase leads to fibrotic remodelling. Extracellular purines modulate fibroblast proliferation by binding onto adenosine receptors and P2 receptors to influence tissue structure and pathologic remodeling.

=== Graft-versus-host disease ===
Following tissue injury in patients with Graft-versus-host disease (GVHD), ATP is released into the peritoneal fluid. It binds onto the P2RX7 receptors of host antigen-presenting cells (APCs) and activates the inflammasomes. As a result, the expression of co-stimulatory molecules by APCs is upregulated. The inhibition of the P2X7 receptor increases the number of regulatory T cells and decreases the incidence of acute GVHD.

== Therapeutic interventions ==
=== Current ===
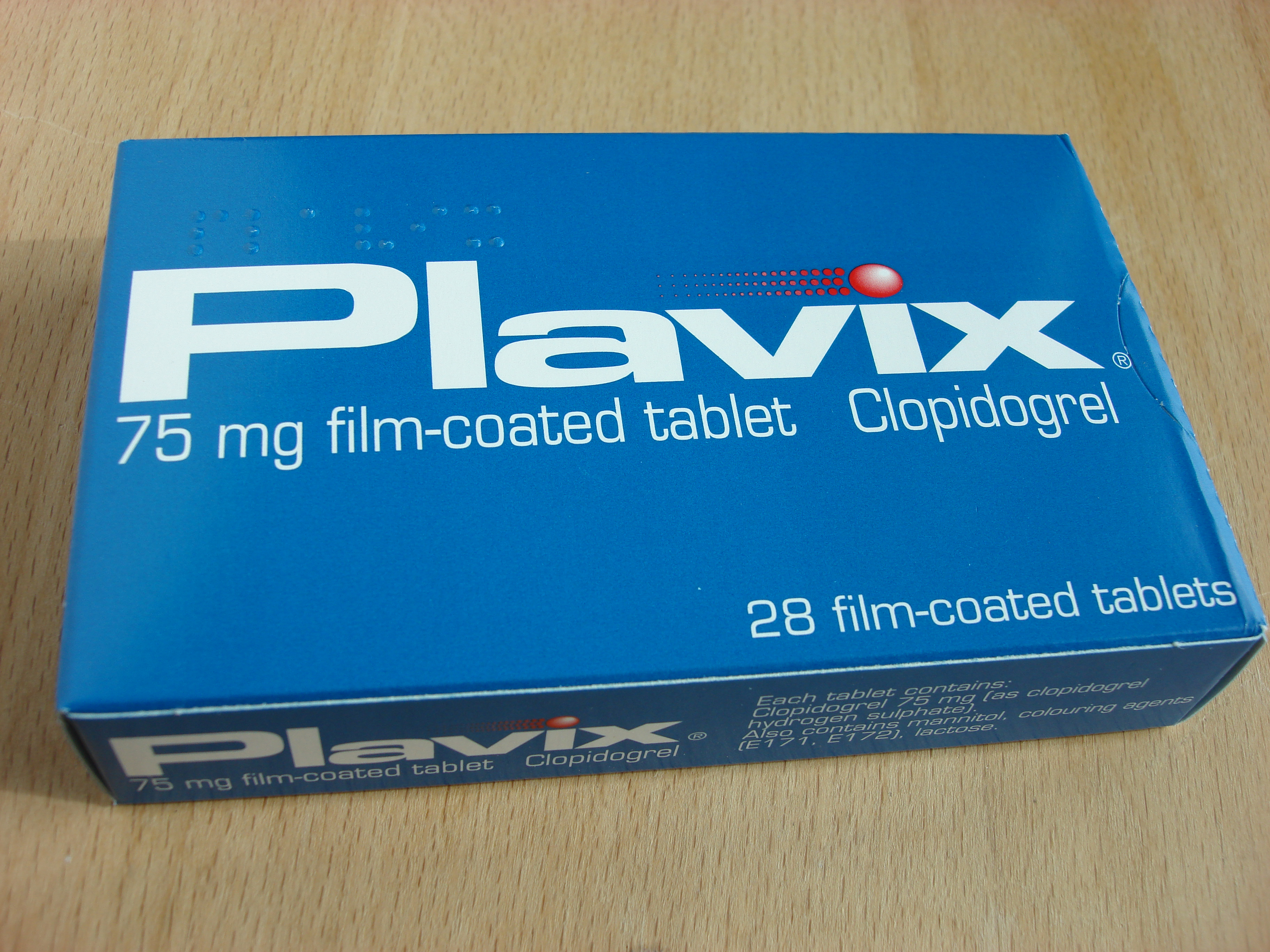
Clopidogrel (Plavix), an inhibitor of the P2Y12 receptor, was formerly the second best-selling drug in the world

Acupuncture

Mechanical deformation of the skin by acupuncture needles has been shown to result in the release of adenosine in mice, and some researchers have suggested this could be related to pain in humans. However, the significance of these results have been questioned, with other researchers pointing out that the results of mouse-acupuncture studies are hard to interpret for humans given the significant difference in the position and relative size of the needles. Nevertheless, researchers have suggested that the purported anti-nociceptive effects of acupuncture may be mediated by the adenosine A1 receptor. Similarly, it has been shown that Electroacupuncture triggers the release of a variety of bioactive chemicals, including adenosine, and some researchers have suggested that this may inhibit pain.

Anti-inflammatory drugs

Methotrexate, which has strong anti-inflammatory properties, inhibits the action of dihydrofolate reductase, leading to an accumulation of adenosine. On the other hand, the adenosine-receptor antagonist caffeine reverses the anti-inflammatory effects of methotrexate.

Anti-platelet drugs

Many anti-platelet drugs such as Prasugrel, Ticagrelor, and Ticlopidine are adenosine diphosphate (ADP) receptor inhibitors. Before the expiry of its patent, the P2Y12 receptor antagonist Clopidogrel (trade name: Plavix) was the second most prescribed drug in the world. In 2010 alone, it generated over US$9 billion in global sales.

Bronchodilators

Theophylline was originally used as a bronchodilator, although its usage has declined due to several side effects such as seizures and cardiac arrhythmias caused by adenosine A1 receptor antagonism.

Herbal medicine

Several herbs used in Traditional Chinese medicine contain drug compounds that are antagonists of P2X purinoreceptors. The following table provides an overview of these drug compounds and their interaction with purinergic receptors.

| Herb | Drug compound | Physiologic effects on purinergic receptors |
|---|---|---|
| Many | Tetramethylpyrazine | Attenuation of acute nociception in dorsal root ganglia via P2RX3 antagonism; Modulation of P2RX3 expression on sensory nerve terminals of burned skin |
| Ligusticum wallichii | Sodium ferulate | Reduction of thermal and mechanical hyperalgesia via P2RX3 antagonism |
| Kudzu | Puerarin | Reduction of chronic neuropathic pain via P2RX3 and P2X2/3 antagonism |
| Rheum officinale | Emodin | Inhibition of cancer growth via P2RX7 antagonism |
| Rhubarb | Chrysophanol | Induction of necrosis in human liver cancer cells via a decrease in ATP levels. |

Vasodilators

Regadenoson, a vasodilator which acts on the adenosine A2A receptor, was approved by the United States Food and Drug Administration in 2008 and is currently widely used in the field of cardiology. Both adenosine and dipyridamole, which act on the A2A receptor, are used in myocardial perfusion imaging.

=== Proposed ===
Purinergic signalling is an important regulatory mechanism in a wide range of inflammatory diseases. It is understood that shifting the balance between purinergic P1 and P2 signalling is an emerging therapeutic concept that aims to dampen pathologic inflammation and promote healing. The following list of proposed medications is based on the workings of the purinergic signalling system:

- Diquafosol - Agonist of the P2Y2 receptor used in the treatment of dry eye disease.
- Istradefylline - Antagonist of the adenosine A2A receptor, used in the treatment of Parkinson's disease as an adjunct to L-DOPA.

== History ==
The earliest reports of purinergic signalling date back to 1929, when the Hungarian physiologist Albert Szent-Györgyi observed that purified adenine compounds produced a temporary reduction in heart rate when injected into animals.

In the 1960s, the classical view of autonomic smooth muscle control was based upon Dale's principle, which asserts that each nerve cell can synthesize, store, and release only one neurotransmitter. It was therefore assumed that a sympathetic neuron releases noradrenaline only, while an antagonistic parasympathetic neuron releases acetylcholine only. Although the concept of cotransmission gradually gained acceptance in the 1980s, the belief that a single neuron acts via a single type of neurotransmitter continued to dominate the field of neurotransmission throughout the 1970s.

Beginning in 1972, Geoffrey Burnstock ignited decades of controversy after he proposed the existence of a non-adrenergic, non-cholinergic (NANC) neurotransmitter, which he identified as ATP after observing the cellular responses in a number of systems exposed to the presence of cholinergic and adrenergic blockers.

Burnstock's proposal was met with criticism, since ATP is an ubiquitous intracellular molecular energy source so it seemed counter-intuitive that cells might also actively release this vital molecule as a neurotransmitter. After years of prolonged scepticism, however, the concept of purinergic signalling was gradually accepted by the scientific community.

Today, purinergic signalling is no longer considered to be confined to neurotransmission, but is regarded as a general intercellular communication system of many, if not all, tissues.

== See also ==
- Purinergic Signalling (journal)
- Purine metabolism
