= P2Y receptor =

Subclass of purinergic P2 receptors

P2Y receptors are a family of purinergic G protein-coupled receptors, stimulated by nucleotides such as adenosine triphosphate, adenosine diphosphate, uridine triphosphate, uridine diphosphate and UDP-glucose. To date, eight human P2Y receptors have been cloned: P2Y_{1}, P2Y_{2}, P2Y_{4}, P2Y_{6}, P2Y_{11}, P2Y_{12}, P2Y_{13} and P2Y_{14}.

P2Y receptors are present in almost all human tissues where they exert various biological functions based on their G-protein coupling. P2Y receptors mediate responses including vasodilation, blood clotting, and immune response. Due to their ubiquity and variety in function, they are a common biological target in pharmacological development.

== Structure ==
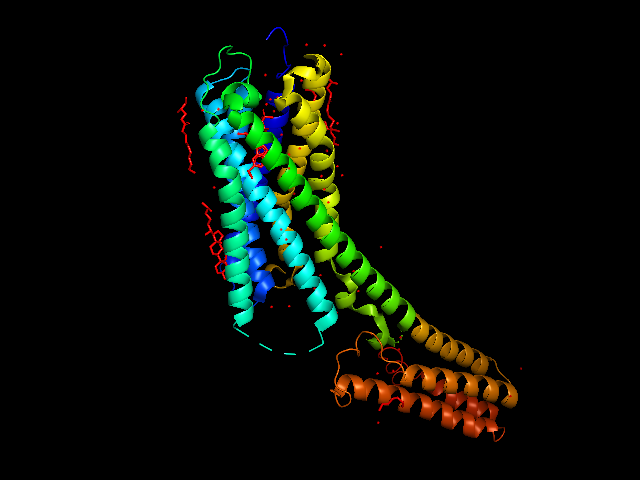
P2Y_{12} structure as generated by PYMOL with color-coded helices

P2Y receptors are membrane proteins belonging to the class A family of G protein-coupled receptors (GPCRs). P2Y receptor proteins display large-scale structural domains typical of GPCRs, consisting of seven hydrophobic transmembrane helices connected by three short extracellular loops and three variably sized intracellular loops; an extracellular N-terminus; and an intracellular C-terminus. The extracellular regions interact with the receptor ligands, while the intracellular regions activate the G protein, control receptor internalization, and mediate dimerization. Similar to other GPCRs, P2Y receptors can form both homodimers and heterodimers. These dimeric forms may vary significantly in their biochemical and pharmacological properties from the monomeric receptor.

In addition to the structural domains typical of all GPCRs, some structural elements are common across P2Y receptor subtypes. All P2Y receptors contain four extracellular cysteine residues which can form two disulfide bridges, one between the N-terminus domain and the proximal extracellular loop and another between the two remaining extracellular loops. These disulfide bonds have been shown to be involved in ligand binding and signal transduction. In addition, several polar residues found within the transmembrane helices are highly conserved across both species and receptor subtypes. Mutational analysis has suggested that these residues are integral to the ligand-binding mechanism of P2Y receptors. Outside of these conserved regions, the P2Y receptor family exhibits unusually high diversity in primary structure, with P2Y_{1} sharing only 19% of its primary structure with P2Y_{12}. Despite this, the individual P2Y subtypes are highly conserved across species, with human and mouse P2Y receptors sharing 95% of amino acids.

The ligand-binding mechanisms of P2Y receptors are not currently well established. The binding complex of P2Y receptors with ATP is of significant interest, as no P2Y receptor contains amino acids sequences similar to any of the many established ATP-binding sites. Recent x-ray crystallography of the human P2Y_{12} receptor has shown several structural irregularities in regions that are typically highly conserved across GPCRs.

In contrast to the unusual structure and behavior of the extracellular ligand binding domains, P2Y intracellular domains appear to be structurally and mechanistically similar to other GPCRs.

== Signal transduction ==
P2Y receptors respond either positively or negatively to the presence of nucleotides in extracellular solution. Nucleotides may be divided into two categories: purines and pyrimidines. Individual P2Y receptor species may respond to only purines, only pyrimidines, or both; the activation profiles of the eight known P2Y receptors are listed below.

P2Y species	Receptivity
P2Y_{1}	Activation by purines
P2Y_{2}	Activation by purines and pyrimidines triphosphates
P2Y_{4}	Activation by pyrimidines
P2Y_{6}	Activation by pyrimidines
P2Y_{11}	Activation by purines
P2Y_{12}	Inactivation by ADP through G_{1} protein
P2Y_{13}	Inactivation by ADP through G_{1} protein
P2Y_{14}	Activation by UDP-Glucose

The activity of P2Y receptors is linked to a signal cascade originating in regulation of the flow of Ca^{2+} and K^{+} ions by the receptor's interactions with G proteins, modulating access to Ca^{2+} and K^{+} channels, though the exact behavior is dependent upon individual receptor species. Voltage-independent Ca^{2+} channels allow for the free flow of Ca^{2+} ions from the cell activated by P2Y receptors. Oscillation of Ca^{2+} concentration is directly affected by the signal-transduction activity of P2Y_{1}; specifically, through protein kinase C phosphorylation of Thr339 in the carboxy terminus of the P2Y_{1} receptor.

Changes in the concentration of Ca^{2+} have many important ramifications for the cell, including regulation of cell metabolism (e.g. autophagy initiation / regulation), ATP production (through Ca^{2+} entering the mitochondrial outer mitochondrial membrane and stimulation of mitochondrial dehydrogenases leading to the production of ATP), and the possibility of triggering apoptosis. Both autophagy and apoptosis are cell stress responses that play significant roles in cells' overall life cycles, though autophagy seeks to preserve the viability of the cell by recycling unit parts of organelles, while apoptosis acts in the interest of the whole organism at the expense of the cell undergoing apoptosis.

== Pharmacology ==
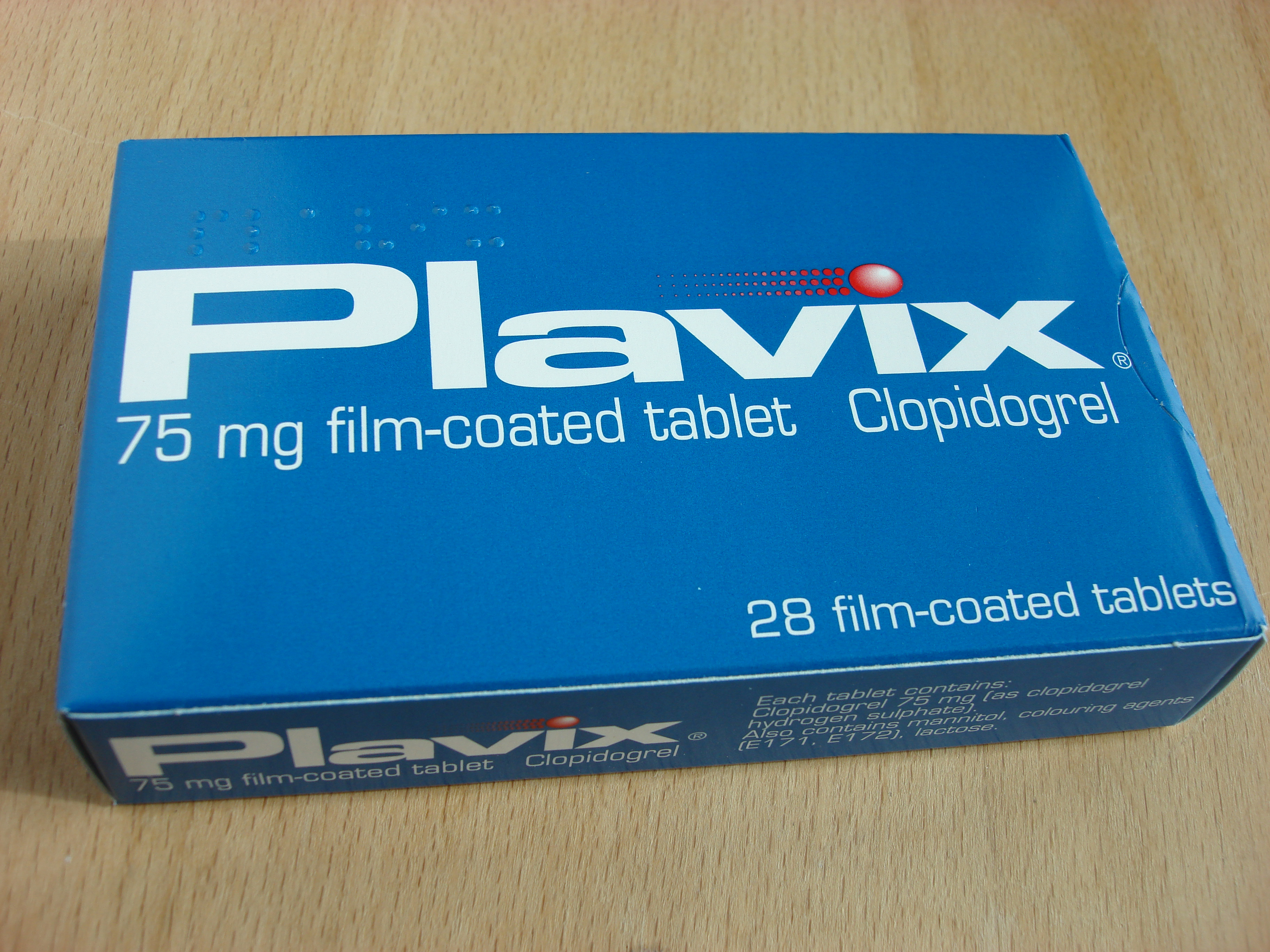
Clopidogrel (Plavix), an inhibitor of the P2Y12 receptor, was formerly the second best-selling drug in the world

Many commonly prescribed medications target P2Y receptors, and active research is being conducted into developing new drugs targeting these receptors. The most commonly prescribed drug targeting P2Y receptors is clopidogrel, an antiplatelet medication which acts on the P2Y_{12} receptor in a manner shared with other thienopyridines. Other pharmaceutical applications include denufosol, which targets P2Y_{2} and is being investigated for the treatment of cystic fibrosis, and diquafosol, a P2Y_{2} agonist used in the treatment of dry eye disease.

P2Y_{6} receptors have been shown to play a role in cerebral vasodilation. UDP-analogs which bind to this receptor have been investigated as possible treatments for migraines.

P2Y_{11} is a regulator of immune response, and a common polymorphism carried by almost 20% of North European caucasians give increased risk of myocardial infarction, making P2Y_{11} an interesting drug target candidate for treatment of myocardial infarction.

In addition to established uses, pharmaceutical research has been conducted into the role of P2Y receptors in osteoporosis, diabetes, and cardio-protection.

== Coupling ==
The biological effects of P2Y receptor activation depends on how they couple to downstream signalling pathways, either via G_{i}, G_{q/11} or G_{s} G proteins. Human P2Y receptors have the following G protein coupling:

Protein	Gene	Coupling	Nucleotide
P2RY_{1}	P2RY1	G_{q/11}	ADP
P2RY_{2}	P2RY2	G_{q/11} (and G_{i})	ATP, UTP
P2RY_{4}	P2RY4	G_{q/11} (and G_{i})	UTP
P2RY_{5} / LPA_{6}	LPAR6		Lysophosphatidic acid
P2RY_{6}	P2RY6	G_{q/11}	UDP
P2RY_{8}	P2RY8		orphan receptor
P2RY_{9} / LPAR_{4} / GPR23	LPAR4		Lysophosphatidic acid
P2RY_{10}	P2RY10		orphan receptor
P2RY_{11}	P2RY11	G_{q/11} and G_{s}	ATP
P2RY_{12}	P2RY12	G_{i}	ADP
P2RY_{13}	P2RY13	G_{i}	ADP
P2RY_{14}	P2RY14	G_{i}	UDP-glucose

The gaps in P2Y receptor numbering is due to that several receptors (P2Y_{3}, P2Y_{5}, P2Y_{7}, P2Y_{8}, P2Y_{9}, P2Y_{10}) were thought to be P2Y receptors when they were cloned, when in fact they are not.

== See also ==
- Receptor (biochemistry)
- Purinergic signalling
- Membrane protein
- Receptor theory
