= ACAD10 =

Protein-coding gene in humans

Identifiers
- Aliases: ACAD10, acyl-CoA dehydrogenase family member 10
- External IDs: OMIM: 611181; MGI: 1919235; GeneCards: ACAD10

Gene location (Human)
Chr.	Chromosome 12 (human)
Band	12q24.12	Start	111,686,053 bp
Band	12q24.12	End	111,757,107 bp

Gene location (Mouse)
Chr.	Chromosome 5 (mouse)
Band	5|5 F	Start	121,759,089 bp
Band	5|5 F	End	121,798,577 bp
RNA expression pattern
Bgee	Human / Mouse (ortholog); Top expressed in: apex of heart; right lobe of liver; parotid gland; mucosa of transverse colon; human kidney; right adrenal gland; right adrenal cortex; right uterine tube; body of pancreas; left adrenal cortex / Top expressed in: proximal tubule; right kidney; human kidney; trigeminal ganglion; liver; white adipose tissue; urinary bladder; muscle of thigh; adrenal gland; spermatocyte; More reference expression data
BioGPS	n/a
Gene ontology
Molecular function	oxidoreductase activity, acting on the CH-CH group of donors; oxidoreductase activity; hydrolase activity; acyl-CoA dehydrogenase activity; flavin adenine dinucleotide binding
Cellular component	mitochondrial matrix; mitochondrion
Biological process	fatty acid beta-oxidation; metabolism; fatty acid beta-oxidation using acyl-CoA dehydrogenase
Sources:Amigo / QuickGO
Orthologs
Databases	NCBI: entry; OMA: entry
Species	Human	Mouse
Entrez	80724	71985
Ensembl	ENSG00000111271	ENSMUSG00000029456
UniProt	Q6JQN1	Q8K370
RefSeq (mRNA)	NM_025247; NM_001136538; NM_001136542	NM_028037
RefSeq (protein)	NP_001130010; NP_079523	NP_082313
Location (UCSC)	Chr 12: 111.69 – 111.76 Mb	Chr 5: 121.76 – 121.8 Mb
PubMed search
- Wikidata
View/Edit Human	View/Edit Mouse

Acyl-CoA dehydrogenase family, member 10 is a protein that in humans is encoded by the ACAD10 gene.

== Structure ==
This gene encodes a member of the acyl-CoA dehydrogenase family of enzymes (ACADs), which participate in the beta-oxidation of fatty acids in mitochondria. The encoded enzyme contains a hydrolase domain at the N-terminal portion, a serine/threonine protein kinase catalytic domain in the central region, and a conserved ACAD domain at the C-terminus. Several alternatively spliced transcript variants of this gene have been described, but the full-length nature of some of these variants has not been determined.

== Clinical significance ==
In Pima people, ACAD10 has been identified as a gene associated with type 2 diabetes, insulin resistance, and impaired lipid metabolism. Specifically, two single nucleotide polymorphisms, rs601663 and rs659964, have been significantly correlated with these symptoms in a large population of both the Pima people and American Indians.

== Interactions ==
Using affinity capture mass spectrometry, an interaction is inferred when a bait protein is affinity captured from cell extracts by either polyclonal antibody or epitope tag and the associated interaction partner is identified by mass spectrometric methods. Using this method, ACAD10 has been shown to interact with P2RY8, NDUFA10, NTRK3, SLC2A12, LPAR4, PTH1R, COLEC10, APP, MAS1, CD79A, BSG, and Ubiquitin C.
