= TTX-030 =

Monoclonal antibody

Monoclonal antibody
- Type: ?

Identifiers
- CAS Number: 2646628-62-6

TTX-030 is an experimental anti-CD39 monoclonal antibody developed by AbbVie to treat pancreatic cancer.
