= ENTPD1 =

Mammalian protein found in humans

Identifiers
- Aliases: ENTPD1, ATPDase, CD39, NTPDase-1, SPG64, ectonucleoside triphosphate diphosphohydrolase 1
- External IDs: OMIM: 601752; MGI: 102805; GeneCards: ENTPD1
Enzyme activity
EC #	BRENDA	ExPASy	KEGG	MetaCyc
3.6.1.5	↗	↗	↗	↗

Gene location (Human)
Chr.	Chromosome 10 (human)
Band	10q24.1	Start	95,711,779 bp
Band	10q24.1	End	95,877,266 bp

Gene location (Mouse)
Chr.	Chromosome 19 (mouse)
Band	19 C3|19 34.25 cM	Start	40,600,810 bp
Band	19 C3|19 34.25 cM	End	40,730,046 bp
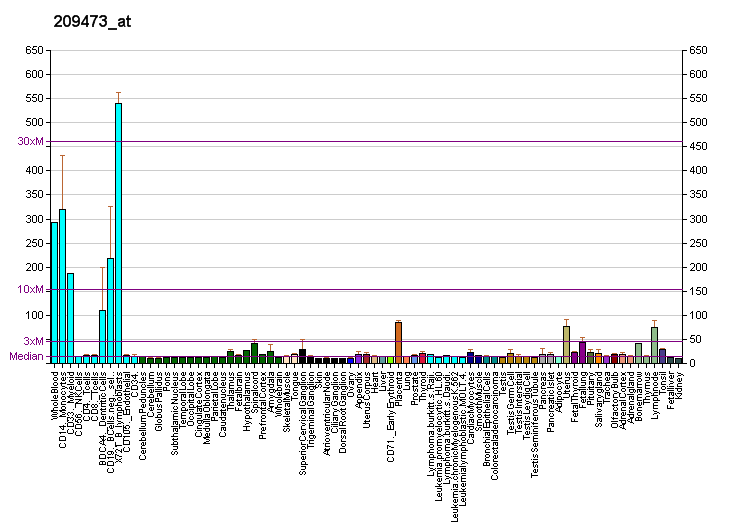

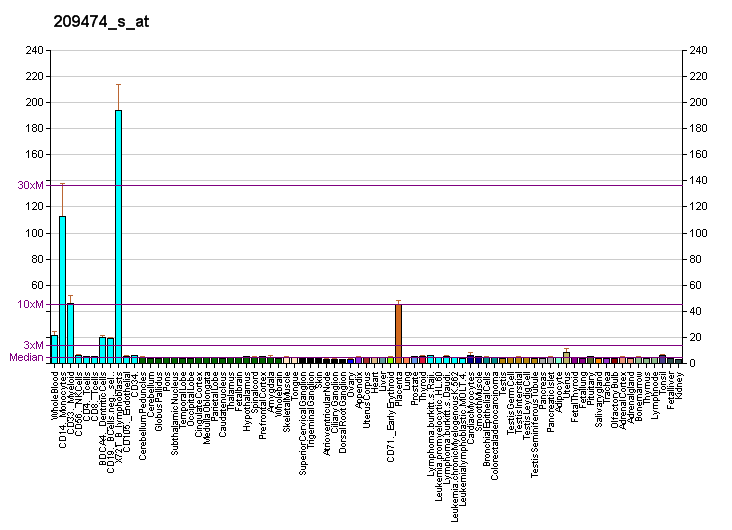

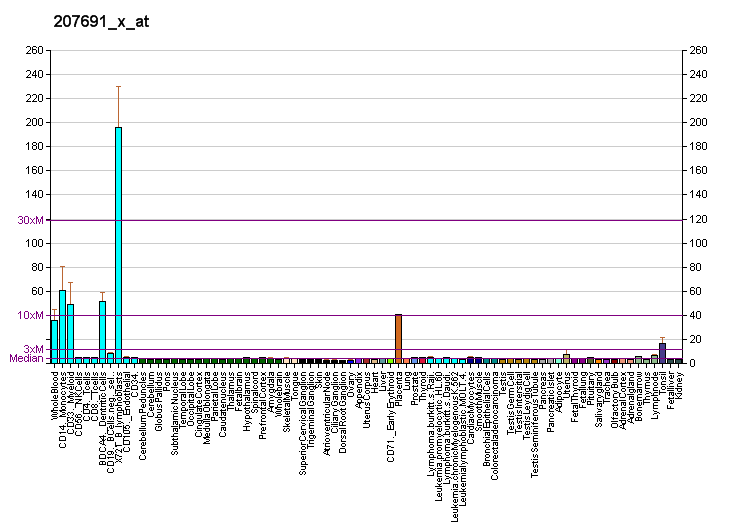
RNA expression pattern
Bgee	Human / Mouse (ortholog); Top expressed in: saphenous vein; monocyte; popliteal artery; tibial arteries; tendon of biceps brachii; gallbladder; right coronary artery; urethra; blood; appendix / Top expressed in: ascending aorta; aortic valve; granulocyte; spermatocyte; spermatid; atrioventricular valve; lens; stroma of bone marrow; conjunctival fornix; carotid body; More reference expression data
BioGPS	More reference expression data
Gene ontology
Molecular function	nucleotide binding; protein binding; hydrolase activity; ATP binding; nucleoside-diphosphatase activity; nucleoside-triphosphatase activity
Cellular component	integral component of membrane; integral component of plasma membrane; extracellular exosome; membrane; plasma membrane
Biological process	cell adhesion; blood coagulation; nucleobase-containing small molecule catabolic process
Sources:Amigo / QuickGO
Orthologs
Databases	NCBI: entry; OMA: entry
Species	Human	Mouse
Entrez	953	12495
Ensembl	ENSG00000138185	ENSMUSG00000048120
UniProt	P49961	P55772
RefSeq (mRNA)	NM_001098175; NM_001164178; NM_001164179; NM_001164181; NM_001164182 NM_001164183; NM_001312654; NM_001776; NM_001320916	NM_009848; NM_001304721
RefSeq (protein)	NP_001091645; NP_001157650; NP_001157651; NP_001157653; NP_001157654 NP_001157655; NP_001299583; NP_001307845; NP_001767	NP_001291650; NP_033978
Location (UCSC)	Chr 10: 95.71 – 95.88 Mb	Chr 19: 40.6 – 40.73 Mb
PubMed search
- Wikidata
View/Edit Human	View/Edit Mouse

Ectonucleoside triphosphate diphosphohydrolase-1 (gene: ENTPD1; protein: NTPDase1) also known as CD39 (Cluster of Differentiation 39), is a typical cell surface enzyme with a catalytic site on the extracellular face.

== Function ==
NTPDase1 is an ectonucleotidase that catalyse the hydrolysis of γ- and β-phosphate residues of triphospho- and diphosphonucleosides to the monophosphonucleoside derivative. NTPDase1 hydrolyzes P2 receptor ligands, namely ATP, ADP, UTP and UDP with similar efficacy. NTPDase1 can therefore affect P2 receptor activation and functions.

== Clinical significance ==
ATP causes a pro-inflammatory environment, whereas degradation of ATP into adenosine by the CD39/CD73 pathway leads to an anti-inflammatory environment. CD39 converts ATP (or ADP) to adenosine monophosphate (AMP), which is converted into adenosine by CD73. A substantial portion of the immune suppressive and anti-inflammatory activity of regulatory T cells (Tregs) is due to the adenosine produced by the CD39/CD73 pathway, insofar as Tregs express CD39 and CD73.

Adenosine produced by the CD39/CD73 pathway can protect against ischemia-reperfusion injury. On the other hand, high expression and activity of CD39 and CD73 on cancer cells can prevent the immune system from inhibiting the progression of cancer.

Biallelic pathogenic variant in ENTPD1 causes autosomal recessive spastic paraplegia 64 (SPG64). SPG64 is a complex hereditary spastic paraplegia characterized by childhood onset progressive spastic paraparesis, delayed developmental milestones, intellectual disability, dysarthria, and white matter abnormalities.

== See also ==
- Cluster of differentiation
