= P2RY6 =

Protein-coding gene in the species Homo sapiens

Identifiers
- Aliases: P2RY6, P2Y6, pyrimidinergic receptor P2Y6
- External IDs: OMIM: 602451; MGI: 2673874; GeneCards: P2RY6
Available structures
PDB	Ortholog search: PDBe RCSB
PDB	List of PDB id codes 2B6R

Gene location (Human)
Chr.	Chromosome 11 (human)
Band	11q13.4	Start	73,264,498 bp
Band	11q13.4	End	73,305,103 bp

Gene location (Mouse)
Chr.	Chromosome 7 (mouse)
Band	7|7 E2	Start	100,586,837 bp
Band	7|7 E2	End	100,623,856 bp
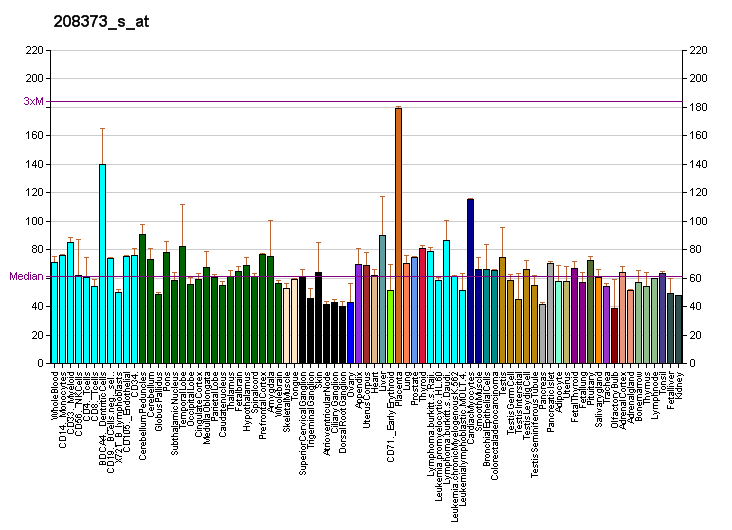
RNA expression pattern
Bgee	Human / Mouse (ortholog); Top expressed in: spleen; placenta; right coronary artery; left coronary artery; gonad; appendix; human kidney; muscle of thigh; thoracic aorta; ascending aorta / Top expressed in: stroma of bone marrow; ascending aorta; aortic valve; mesenteric lymph nodes; calvaria; left colon; tunica media of zone of aorta; ankle; internal carotid artery; subcutaneous adipose tissue; More reference expression data
BioGPS	More reference expression data
Gene ontology
Molecular function	G protein-coupled purinergic nucleotide receptor activity; G protein-coupled receptor activity; protein binding; G protein-coupled UDP receptor activity; signal transducer activity; G protein-coupled ADP receptor activity; G protein-coupled UTP receptor activity
Cellular component	integral component of membrane; plasma membrane; basolateral plasma membrane; integral component of plasma membrane; apical plasma membrane; membrane
Biological process	positive regulation of smooth muscle cell migration; phospholipase C-activating G protein-coupled receptor signaling pathway; cellular response to organic cyclic compound; transepithelial chloride transport; signal transduction; G protein-coupled purinergic nucleotide receptor signaling pathway; cellular response to prostaglandin E stimulus; G protein-coupled receptor signaling pathway; positive regulation of ERK1 and ERK2 cascade; positive regulation of vascular associated smooth muscle cell proliferation; phagocytosis; activation of phospholipase C activity; positive regulation of inositol 1,4,5-trisphosphate-sensitive calcium-release channel activity; positive regulation of inositol trisphosphate biosynthetic process; cellular response to purine-containing compound; cellular response to pyrimidine ribonucleotide
Sources:Amigo / QuickGO
Orthologs
Databases	NCBI: entry; OMA: entry
Species	Human	Mouse
Entrez	5031	233571
Ensembl	ENSG00000171631	ENSMUSG00000048779
UniProt	Q15077	Q9ERK9
RefSeq (mRNA)	NM_001277204; NM_001277205; NM_001277206; NM_001277207; NM_001277208 NM_004154; NM_176796; NM_176797; NM_176798	NM_183168
RefSeq (protein)	NP_001264133; NP_001264134; NP_001264135; NP_001264136; NP_001264137 NP_789766; NP_789767; NP_789768	NP_898991
Location (UCSC)	Chr 11: 73.26 – 73.31 Mb	Chr 7: 100.59 – 100.62 Mb
PubMed search
- Wikidata
View/Edit Human	View/Edit Mouse

P2Y purinoceptor 6 is a protein that in humans is encoded by the P2RY6 gene.

== Function ==
The product of this gene, P2Y_{6}, belongs to the family of G-protein coupled receptors. This family has several receptor subtypes with different pharmacological selectivity, which overlaps in some cases, for various adenosine and uridine nucleotides. This receptor is responsive to UDP, partially responsive to UTP and ADP, and not responsive to ATP. Four transcript variants encoding the same isoform have been identified for this gene.

== See also ==
- P2Y receptor
