= RNA uridylyltransferase =

Class of enzymes

Identifiers
- EC no.: 2.7.7.52
- CAS no.: 78519-53-6

Databases
- IntEnz: IntEnz view
- BRENDA: BRENDA entry
- ExPASy: NiceZyme view
- KEGG: KEGG entry
- MetaCyc: metabolic pathway
- PRIAM: profile
- PDB structures: RCSB PDB PDBe PDBsum
- Gene Ontology: AmiGO / QuickGO
Search
- PMC: articles
- PubMed: articles
- NCBI: proteins

In enzymology, a RNA uridylyltransferase (EC 2.7.7.52) is an enzyme that catalyzes the chemical reaction

UTP + RNA_{n} $\rightleftharpoons$ diphosphate + RNA_{n+1}

Thus, the two substrates of this enzyme are UTP and RNA_{n}, whereas its two products are diphosphate and RNA_{n+1}.

This enzyme belongs to the family of transferases, specifically those transferring phosphorus-containing nucleotide groups (nucleotidyltransferases). The systematic name of this enzyme class is UTP:RNA uridylyltransferase. Other names in common use include terminal uridylyltransferase, and TUT.

== Structural studies ==
As of late 2007, 8 structures have been solved for this class of enzymes, with PDB accession codes 2E5G, 2IKF, 2NOM, 2Q0C, 2Q0D, 2Q0E, 2Q0F, and 2Q0G.
