= UDP-N-acetylgalactosamine diphosphorylase =

Class of enzymes

Identifiers
- EC no.: 2.7.7.83

Databases
- IntEnz: IntEnz view
- BRENDA: BRENDA entry
- ExPASy: NiceZyme view
- KEGG: KEGG entry
- MetaCyc: metabolic pathway
- PRIAM: profile
- PDB structures: RCSB PDB PDBe PDBsum
Search
- PMC: articles
- PubMed: articles
- NCBI: proteins

UDP-N-acetylgalactosamine diphosphorylase (EC 2.7.7.83) is an enzyme with systematic name UTP:N-acetyl-alpha-D-galactosamine-1-phosphate uridylyltransferase. This enzyme catalyses the following reversible chemical reaction

uridine triphosphate
+
(1)
PP_{i}
PP_{i}
UDP-GalNAc

The enzyme characterised from humans and pig liver combines uridine triphosphate and N-acetyl-α-D-galactosamine 1-phosphate (1) to give uridine diphosphate N-acetylgalactosamine (UDP-GalNAc), with pyrophosphate (PP_{i}) as a byproduct.

The enzyme from plants and animals also acts on N-acetyl-alpha-D-glucosamine 1-phosphate.
