= Cangrelor =

Chemical compound

Clinical data
- Trade names: Kengreal, Kengrexal, others
- Other names: AR-C69931MX
- AHFS/Drugs.com: Monograph
- License data: US DailyMed: Cangrelor
- Routes of administration: Intravenous
- ATC code: B01AC25 (WHO)

Legal status
- Legal status: CA: ℞-only; US: ℞-only; EU: Rx-only

Pharmacokinetic data
- Bioavailability: 100% (IV)
- Protein binding: ~97–98%.
- Metabolism: Rapid deactivation in the circulation (independent of CYP system)
- Elimination half-life: ~3–6 minutes
- Excretion: Kidney (58%), Bile duct (35%)

Identifiers
- IUPAC name: [dichloro-[[[(2R,3S,4R,5R)-3,4-dihydroxy-5-[6-(2-methylsulfanylethylamino)-2-(3,3,3-trifluoropropylsulfanyl)purin-9-yl]oxolan-2-yl]methoxy-hydroxyphosphoryl]oxy-hydroxyphosphoryl]methyl]phosphonic acid
- CAS Number: 163706-06-7
- PubChem CID: 9854012
- IUPHAR/BPS: 1776
- DrugBank: DB06441
- ChemSpider: 8029718
- UNII: 6AQ1Y404U7
- KEGG: D03359; as salt: D03361
- ChEBI: CHEBI:90841
- ChEMBL: ChEMBL1097279
- CompTox Dashboard (EPA): DTXSID90167651

Chemical and physical data
- Formula: C_{17}H_{25}Cl_{2}F_{3}N_{5}O_{12}P_{3}S_{2}
- Molar mass: 776.35 g·mol^{−1}
- 3D model (JSmol): Interactive image
- SMILES: CSCCNC1=NC(=NC2=C1N=CN2[C@H]3[C@@H]([C@@H]([C@H](O3)COP(=O)(O)OP(=O)(C(P(=O)(O)O)(Cl)Cl)O)O)O)SCCC(F)(F)F
- InChI: InChI=1S/C17H25Cl2F3N5O12P3S2/c1-43-5-3-23-12-9-13(26-15(25-12)44-4-2-16(20,21)22)27(7-24-9)14-11(29)10(28)8(38-14)6-37-42(35,36)39-41(33,34)17(18,19)40(30,31)32/h7-8,10-11,14,28-29H,2-6H2,1H3,(H,33,34)(H,35,36)(H,23,25,26)(H2,30,31,32)/t8-,10-,11-,14-/m1/s1; Key:PAEBIVWUMLRPSK-IDTAVKCVSA-N

Cangrelor, sold under the brand name Kengreal among others, is a P2Y_{12} inhibitor FDA approved as of June 2015 as an antiplatelet drug for intravenous application. Some P2Y_{12} inhibitors are used clinically as effective inhibitors of adenosine diphosphate-mediated platelet activation and aggregation.

It is authorized as a generic medication.

== Medical use ==
According to phase III randomized trials, a cangrelor–clopidogrel combination is safe and has been found to be more effective than standard clopidogrel treatment at reducing ischemic events in the heart, without increasing major bleeding in the treatment of stenotic coronary arteries. The advantages of this drug combination are most prominent in patients with myocardial infarction.

Available antiplatelet drugs have delayed onset and offset of action. Since cangrelor's effects are immediate and quickly reversed, it is a more desirable drug for elective treatment of stenotic coronary arteries, high risk acute coronary syndromes treated with immediate coronary stenting, and for bridging those surgery patients who require P2Y_{12} inhibition.

Evidence regarding cangrelor therapy is limited by the lack studies assessing cangrelor administration in conjunction with either prasugrel or ticagrelor.

Cangrelor been approved for adults undergoing percutaneous coronary intervention (PCI).

== Adverse effects ==
Despite fewer bleeding events during cardiac surgery, cangrelor carries the risk of potential autoimmune reactions manifesting as breathlessness. Potential mechanisms for dyspnea following cangrelor treatment include: repeated binding and unbinding cycles, impaired platelet turnover, and lung sequestration or apoptosis of overloaded destructive platelets. The dyspnea risks following cangrelor treatment, suggest a common mechanism linking transfusion-related acute lung injury, dyspnea, and reversible platelet inhibition.

The risk of breathlessness after intravenous cangrelor is smaller when compared with other reversible platelet P2Y_{12} receptor inhibitors, however, it is still significantly higher when compared to irreversible oral antiplatelet drugs or intravenous glycoprotein IIb/IIIa inhibitors; which do not increase the incidence of breathlessness at all.

== Pharmacology ==
Cangrelor is a high-affinity, reversible inhibitor of P2Y_{12} receptors that causes almost complete inhibition of ADP-induced platelet aggregate. It is a modified ATP derivative stable to enzymatic degradation. It does not require metabolic conversion to an active metabolite. This allows cangrelor's immediate effect after infusion, and the therapeutic effects can be maintained with continuous infusion. The pharmacokinetics of cangrelor has allowed it to rapidly achieve steady-state concentrations with a clearance of 50 L/h and a half-life of 2.6 to 3.3 minutes. Cessation of its administration is associated with rapid removal, and normal platelet function is restored within 1 hour.

== Chemistry ==
=== Synthesis ===
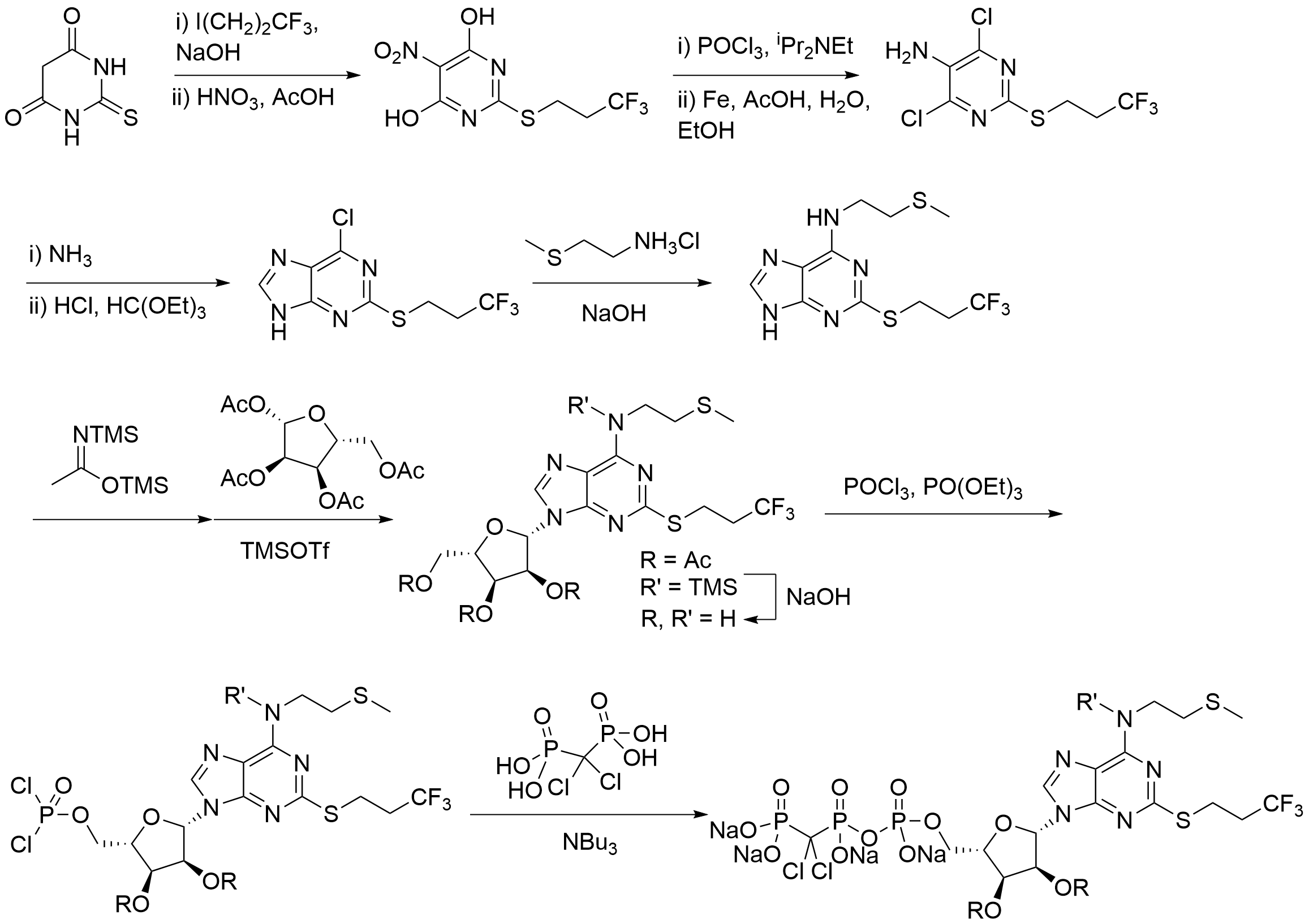
Synthesis of Cangrelor

Cangrelor is synthesized starting from 2-thiobarbituric acid and peracetyl-D-ribofuranose.

The synthesis starts with the selective S-alkylation of 2-thiobarbituric acid, followed by nitration with nitric acid, leading to the nitrated dihydroxypyrimidine. Treatment with phosphorus oxychloride affords the corresponding dichloropyrimidine. Subsequently, the nitro group is reduced using iron as the reductant, yielding the aniline derivative. This is cyclized to the purine using triethyl orthoformate and hydrochloric acid.

N,O-bis-(trimethylsilyl)acetamide is used to protect the anilinic nitrogen, allowing for the selective N9-alkylation of the compound with peracetyl-D-ribofuranose using trimethylsilyl triflate.

The 5'-OH is converted to a phosphodichloridate using phosphorus oxychloride in triethyl phosphate as the solvent. This is converted to Cangrelor without isolation by reaction with dichloromethylenebis(phosphonic acid) and tributylamine as the base.

== Research ==
Poor interim results led to the abandonment of the two CHAMPION clinical trials in mid-2009. The BRIDGE study, for short term use prior to surgery, continues. The CHAMPION PHOENIX trial was a randomized study of over 11,000 patients published in 2013. It found usefulness of cangrelor in patients getting cardiac stents. Compared with clopidogrel given around the time of stenting, intravenous ADP-receptor blockade with cangrelor significantly reduced the rate of stent thrombosis and myocardial infarction. Reviewers have questioned the methodology of the trial.
