= UTP-monosaccharide-1-phosphate uridylyltransferase =

Class of enzymes

Identifiers
- EC no.: 2.7.7.64

Databases
- IntEnz: IntEnz view
- BRENDA: BRENDA entry
- ExPASy: NiceZyme view
- KEGG: KEGG entry
- MetaCyc: metabolic pathway
- PRIAM: profile
- PDB structures: RCSB PDB PDBe PDBsum
Search
- PMC: articles
- PubMed: articles
- NCBI: proteins

In enzymology, an UTP-monosaccharide-1-phosphate uridylyltransferase (EC 2.7.7.64) is an enzyme that catalyzes the chemical reaction

UTP + a monosaccharide 1-phosphate $\rightleftharpoons$ diphosphate + UDP-monosaccharide

Thus, the two substrates of this enzyme are UTP and monosaccharide 1-phosphate, whereas its two products are diphosphate and UDP-monosaccharide.

This enzyme belongs to the family of transferases, specifically those transferring phosphorus-containing nucleotide groups (nucleotidyltransferases). The systematic name of this enzyme class is '. Other names in common use include UDP-sugar pyrophosphorylase', and PsUSP.
