= P2RY11 =

Protein-coding gene in the species Homo sapiens

Identifiers
- Aliases: P2RY11, P2Y11, purinergic receptor P2Y11
- External IDs: OMIM: 602697; GeneCards: P2RY11
Available structures
PDB	Human UniProt search: PDBe RCSB
PDB	List of PDB id codes 2B6S

Gene location (Human)
Chr.	Chromosome 19 (human)
Band	19p13.2	Start	10,111,693 bp
Band	19p13.2	End	10,115,372 bp
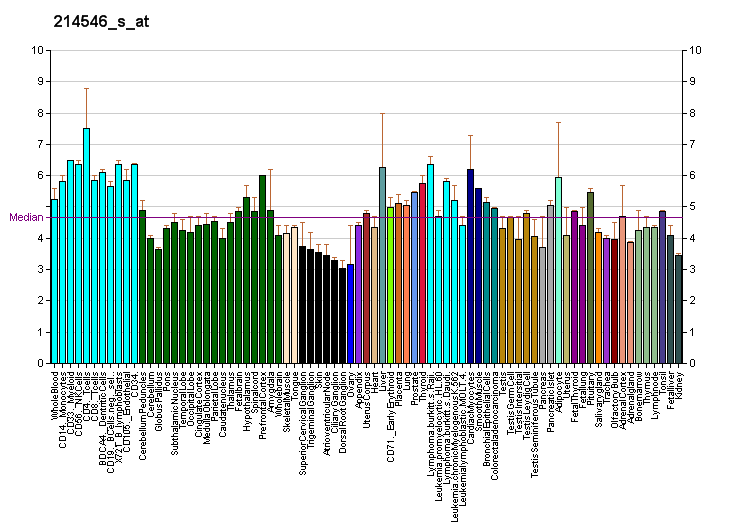
RNA expression pattern
Bgee	Human / Mouse (ortholog); Top expressed in: granulocyte; right uterine tube; skin of leg; skin of abdomen; right frontal lobe; right hemisphere of cerebellum; putamen; mucosa of transverse colon; spleen; primary visual cortex / n/a; More reference expression data
BioGPS	More reference expression data
Gene ontology
Molecular function	G protein-coupled receptor activity; G protein-coupled purinergic nucleotide receptor activity; signal transducer activity; G protein-coupled ATP receptor activity; neurotransmitter receptor activity; signaling receptor activity
Cellular component	integral component of membrane; membrane; plasma membrane; integral component of plasma membrane; intracellular anatomical structure
Biological process	defense response; neuronal signal transduction; activation of adenylate cyclase activity; G protein-coupled purinergic nucleotide receptor signaling pathway; phospholipase C-activating G protein-coupled receptor signaling pathway; cellular response to ATP; calcium-mediated signaling; signal transduction; G protein-coupled adenosine receptor signaling pathway; G protein-coupled receptor signaling pathway
Sources:Amigo / QuickGO
Orthologs
Databases	NCBI: entry; OMA: entry
Species	Human	Mouse
Entrez	5032	n/a
Ensembl	ENSG00000244165	n/a
UniProt	Q96G91	n/a
RefSeq (mRNA)	NM_002566	n/a
RefSeq (protein)	NP_002557	n/a
Location (UCSC)	Chr 19: 10.11 – 10.12 Mb	n/a
PubMed search		n/a
- Wikidata
View/Edit Human

P2Y purinoceptor 11 is a protein that in humans is encoded by the P2RY11 gene.

The product of this gene, P2Y_{11}, belongs to the family of G-protein coupled receptors. This family has several receptor subtypes with different pharmacological selectivity, which overlaps in some cases, for various adenosine and uridine nucleotides. This receptor is coupled to the stimulation of the phosphoinositide and adenylyl cyclase pathways and behaves as a selective purinoceptor. Naturally occurring read-through transcripts, resulting from intergenic splicing between this gene and an immediately upstream gene (PPAN, encoding peter pan homolog), have been found. The PPAN-P2RY11 read-through mRNA is ubiquitously expressed and encodes a fusion protein that shares identity with each individual gene product.

== See also ==
- P2Y receptor
