= P2Y12 =

Protein-coding gene in the species Homo sapiens

P2RY12
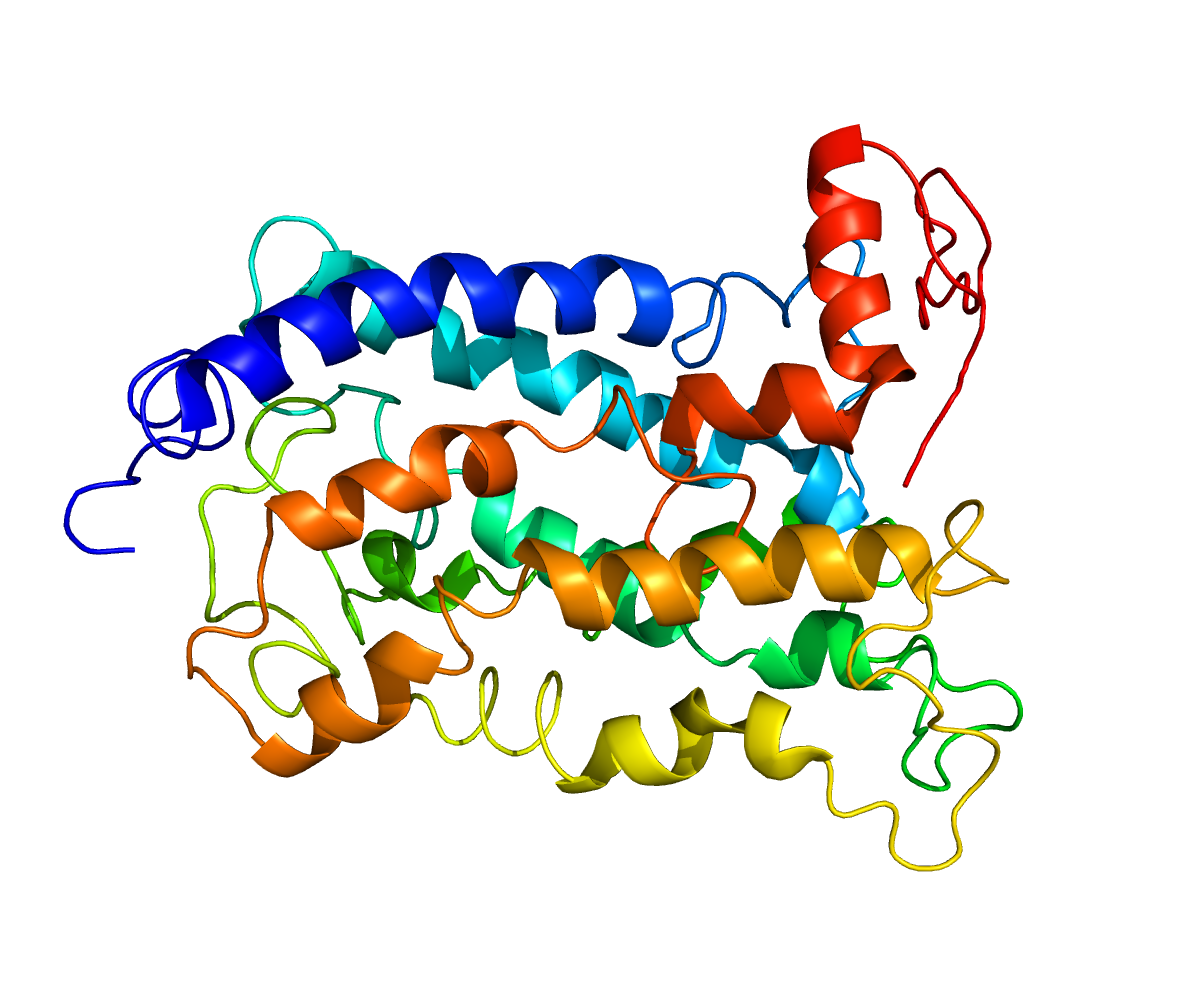

Identifiers
- Aliases: P2RY12, ADPG-R, BDPLT8, HORK3, P2T(AC), P2Y(12)R, P2Y(AC), P2Y(ADP), P2Y(cyc), P2Y12, SP1999, purinergic receptor P2Y12
- External IDs: OMIM: 600515; MGI: 1918089; GeneCards: P2RY12
Available structures
PDB	Ortholog search: PDBe RCSB
PDB	List of PDB id codes 4NTJ, 4PXZ, 4PY0

Gene location (Human)
Chr.	Chromosome 3 (human)
Band	3q25.1	Start	151,336,843 bp
Band	3q25.1	End	151,384,753 bp

Gene location (Mouse)
Chr.	Chromosome 3 (mouse)
Band	3|3 D	Start	59,123,693 bp
Band	3|3 D	End	59,170,292 bp
RNA expression pattern
Bgee	Human / Mouse (ortholog); Top expressed in: inferior ganglion of vagus nerve; superior vestibular nucleus; ventral tegmental area; subthalamic nucleus; Brodmann area 46; monocyte; corpus callosum; spinal ganglia; spinal cord; testicle / Top expressed in: globus pallidus; blood; lumbar subsegment of spinal cord; superior frontal gyrus; primary visual cortex; dentate gyrus of hippocampal formation granule cell; morula; optic nerve; olfactory tubercle; Region I of hippocampus proper; More reference expression data
BioGPS	n/a
Gene ontology
Molecular function	G protein-coupled adenosine receptor activity; G protein-coupled receptor activity; guanyl-nucleotide exchange factor activity; G protein-coupled purinergic nucleotide receptor activity; signal transducer activity; G protein-coupled ADP receptor activity
Cellular component	integral component of membrane; membrane; plasma membrane; integral component of plasma membrane; cell surface; basal plasma membrane; mitochondrion; caveola; intrinsic component of membrane; external side of plasma membrane
Biological process	hemostasis; G protein-coupled adenosine receptor signaling pathway; regulation of calcium ion transport; adenylate cyclase-inhibiting G protein-coupled receptor signaling pathway; protein kinase B signaling; adenylate cyclase-modulating G protein-coupled receptor signaling pathway; negative regulation of cell differentiation; substrate-dependent cell migration, cell extension; cellular response to organic cyclic compound; negative regulation of norepinephrine secretion; G protein-coupled purinergic nucleotide receptor signaling pathway; regulation of microglial cell migration; cell projection organization; calcium ion transmembrane transport; positive regulation of ion transport; potassium ion transmembrane transport; cellular response to ATP; platelet aggregation; glial cell migration; signal transduction; blood coagulation; platelet activation; G protein-coupled receptor signaling pathway; regulation of molecular function
Sources:Amigo / QuickGO
Orthologs
Databases	NCBI: entry; OMA: entry
Species	Human	Mouse
Entrez	64805	70839
Ensembl	ENSG00000169313	ENSMUSG00000036353
UniProt	Q9H244	Q9CPV9
RefSeq (mRNA)	NM_176876; NM_022788	NM_027571; NM_001357007; NM_001357008; NM_001357010
RefSeq (protein)	NP_073625; NP_795345	NP_081847; NP_001343936; NP_001343937; NP_001343939
Location (UCSC)	Chr 3: 151.34 – 151.38 Mb	Chr 3: 59.12 – 59.17 Mb
PubMed search
- Wikidata
View/Edit Human	View/Edit Mouse

P2Y_{12} is a chemoreceptor for adenosine diphosphate (ADP) that belongs to the G_{i} class of a group of G protein-coupled (GPCR) purinergic receptors. This P2Y receptor family has several receptor subtypes with different pharmacological selectivity, which overlaps in some cases, for various adenosine and uridine nucleotides. The P2Y_{12} receptor is involved in platelet aggregation and is thus a biological target for the treatment of thromboembolisms and other clotting disorders. Two transcript variants encoding the same isoform have been identified for this gene.

In the field of purinergic signaling, the P2Y_{12} protein on the periphery is found mainly but not exclusively on the surface of blood platelets, and is an important regulator in blood clotting. In the central nervous system, this receptor has been found expressed exclusively on microglia, where it is necessary for physiological and pathological microglial actions, such as monitoring neuronal functions and microglial neuroprotection.

== P2Y_{12} antagonists ==
The drugs clopidogrel (Plavix), prasugrel (Efient, Effient), ticagrelor (Brilinta), and cangrelor (Kengreal) bind to this receptor and are marketed as antiplatelet agents.

=== For acute coronary syndrome ===
The combination of a P2Y_{12} inhibitor and aspirin, called dual antiplatelet treatment, remains the first-line treatment for acute coronary syndrome. A 2019 randomized trial suggested that prasugrel is superior to ticagrelor.

=== Antiplatelet treatment of STEMI ===
In patients undergoing primary percutaneous coronary intervention (PCI) for an ST-segment elevation myocardial infarction (STEMI), US, European, and Canadian guidelines recommend that a P2Y_{12} inhibitor should be administered as soon as possible, although it is unclear whether administration of these medications before the patient arrives at the hospital confers additional benefits compared with in-hospital administration.

On the other hand, P2Y_{12} inhibitors do not change the risk of death when given as a pretreatment prior to routine PCI in people who have had a non-ST-elevation myocardial infarction (NSTEMI). Though, a P2Y_{12} inhibitor in addition to aspirin should be administered for up to 12 months to most patients with non-ST-elevation acute coronary syndrome. They do however increase the risk of bleeding and decrease the risk of further cardiovascular problems. Thus their routine use in this context is of questionable value.

A network meta-analysis of 37 studies involving 88,402 STEMI patients and 5,077 major adverse cardiac events (MACE) patients found that use of prasugrel was associated with lower mortality and MACE than other drugs in this class (clopidogrel and ticagrelor).
