= P2RY10 =

Protein-coding gene in the species Homo sapiens

Identifiers
- Aliases: P2RY10, LYPSR2, P2Y10, purinergic receptor P2Y10, P2Y receptor family member 10
- External IDs: OMIM: 300529; MGI: 1926076; GeneCards: P2RY10

Gene location (Human)
Chr.	X chromosome (human)
Band	Xq21.1	Start	78,945,332 bp
Band	Xq21.1	End	78,963,727 bp

Gene location (Mouse)
Chr.	X chromosome (mouse)
Band	X|X D	Start	106,132,098 bp
Band	X|X D	End	106,148,580 bp
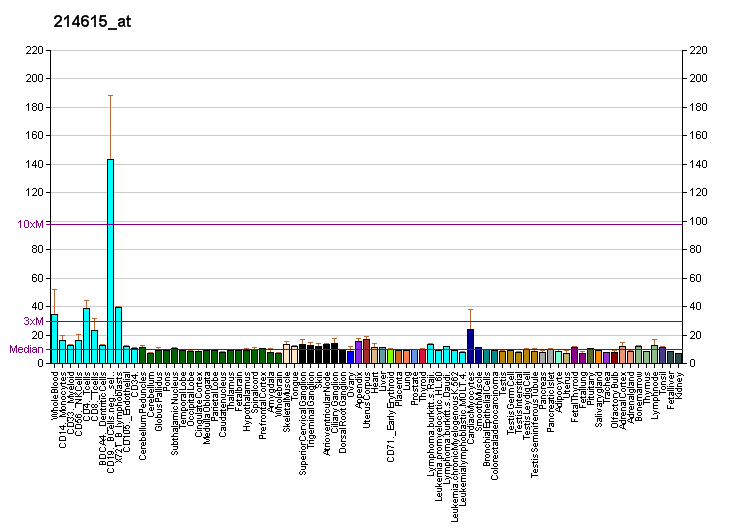
RNA expression pattern
Bgee	Human / Mouse (ortholog); Top expressed in: lymph node; epithelium of nasopharynx; blood; granulocyte; appendix; spleen; epithelium of colon; bone marrow; superficial temporal artery; bone marrow cell / Top expressed in: mesenteric lymph nodes; thymus; spleen; blood; lumbar spinal ganglion; subcutaneous adipose tissue; white adipose tissue; pharynx; bone marrow; mammary gland; More reference expression data
BioGPS	More reference expression data
Gene ontology
Molecular function	G protein-coupled purinergic nucleotide receptor activity; signal transducer activity; G protein-coupled receptor activity
Cellular component	integral component of membrane; plasma membrane; membrane; integral component of plasma membrane
Biological process	signal transduction; G protein-coupled purinergic nucleotide receptor signaling pathway; positive regulation of Rho protein signal transduction; positive regulation of cytosolic calcium ion concentration involved in phospholipase C-activating G protein-coupled signaling pathway; G protein-coupled receptor signaling pathway
Sources:Amigo / QuickGO
Orthologs
Databases	NCBI: entry; OMA: entry
Species	Human	Mouse
Entrez	27334	78826
Ensembl	ENSG00000078589	ENSMUSG00000050921
UniProt	O00398	Q8BFU7
RefSeq (mRNA)	NM_014499; NM_198333; NM_001324218; NM_001324221; NM_001324225	NM_172435; NM_001357810
RefSeq (protein)	NP_001311147; NP_001311150; NP_001311154; NP_055314; NP_938147	NP_766023; NP_001344739
Location (UCSC)	Chr X: 78.95 – 78.96 Mb	Chr X: 106.13 – 106.15 Mb
PubMed search
- Wikidata
View/Edit Human	View/Edit Mouse

Putative P2Y purinoceptor 10 is a protein that, in humans, is encoded by the P2RY10 gene.

== Function ==
The protein encoded by this gene belongs to the family of G-protein coupled receptors that are preferentially activated by adenosine and uridine nucleotides. Two alternatively spliced transcript variants encoding the same protein isoform have been found for this gene.

== See also ==
- P2Y receptor
