= Ectonucleotidase =

Ectonucleotidases consist of families of nucleotide metabolizing enzymes that are expressed on the plasma membrane and have externally oriented active sites. These enzymes metabolize nucleotides to nucleosides. The contribution of ectonucleotidases in the modulation of purinergic signaling depends on the availability and preference of substrates and on cell and tissue distribution.

== Classification ==
Subfamilies of ectonucleotidases include: CD39/NTPDases (ecto-nucleotide triphosphate diphosphohydrolases), Nucleotide pyrophosphatase/phosphodiesterase (NPP)-type ecto-phosphodiesterases, alkaline phosphatases and ecto-5’-nucleotidases/CD73.

== Function ==
Ectonucleotidases produce key molecules for purine salvage and consequent replenishment of ATP stores within multiple cell types. Dephosphorylated nucleoside derivatives interact with membrane transporters to enable intracellular uptake. Ectonucleotidases modulate P2 purinergic signaling, and P1 receptors. In addition, ectonucleotidases generate extracellular adenosine, which abrogates nucleotide-mediated effects and activates adenosine receptors, often with opposing (patho-) physiological effects.

== Adenosine generation ==
The first step in the production of adenosine involves the conversion of ATP/ADP to AMP. It is carried out by ENTPD1, also known as CD39. The second step involves the conversion of AMP to adenosine. It is carried out by NT5E, also known as CD73.
