= Purinergic Signalling (journal) =

- Discipline: Neuroscience
- Language: English
- Edited by: Charles Kennedy

Publication details
- History: 2004-present
- Publisher: Springer Science+Business Media
- Frequency: Quarterly
- Impact factor: 3.5 (2022)

Standard abbreviations
- ISO 4: Purinergic Signal.

Indexing
- CODEN: PSUIA9
- ISSN: 1573-9538 (print); 1573-9546 (web)
- OCLC no.: 57767451

Links
- Journal homepage; Online archive

Purinergic Signalling is a quarterly peer-reviewed scientific journal covering research on purinergic signalling. It is published by Springer Science+Business Media and its editor-in-chief is Charles Kennedy. The founding editor was Geoffrey Burnstock.

== Abstracting and indexing ==
The journal is abstracted and indexed in:

- Biological Abstracts
- BIOSIS
- Chemical Abstracts Service
- MEDLINE/PubMed
- Science Citation Index Expanded
- Scopus

According to the Journal Citation Reports, it had a 2012 impact factor of 2.635.
