= P2RY13 =

Protein-coding gene in the species Homo sapiens

Identifiers
- Aliases: P2RY13, GPCR1, GPR86, GPR94, P2Y13, SP174, FKSG77, purinergic receptor P2Y13
- External IDs: OMIM: 606380; MGI: 1921441; GeneCards: P2RY13
Available structures
| PDB | Ortholog search: PDBe RCSB |
| PDB | List of PDB id codes 2B6U |

Gene location (Human)
| Chr. | Chromosome 3 (human) |
| Band | 3q25.1 | Start | 151,326,312 bp |
| Band | 3q25.1 | End | 151,329,549 bp |

Gene location (Mouse)
| Chr. | Chromosome 3 (mouse) |
| Band | 3|3 D | Start | 59,115,313 bp |
| Band | 3|3 D | End | 59,118,303 bp |
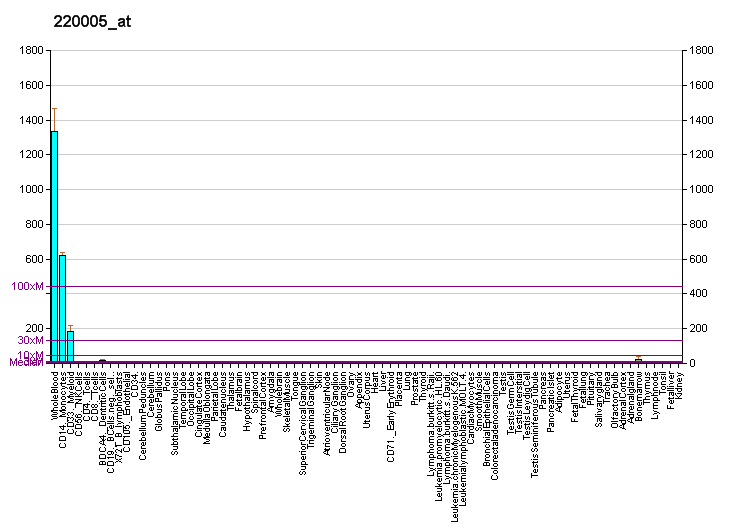
RNA expression pattern
| Bgee | Human / Mouse (ortholog); Top expressed in: monocyte; blood; granulocyte; spleen; bone marrow; trabecular bone; bone marrow cell; appendix; lymph node; testicle / Top expressed in: granulocyte; mesenteric lymph nodes; spleen; lumbar subsegment of spinal cord; Region I of hippocampus proper; dentate gyrus of hippocampal formation granule cell; embryo; bone marrow; visual cortex; stroma of bone marrow; More reference expression data |
| BioGPS | More reference expression data |
Gene ontology
| Molecular function | G protein-coupled purinergic nucleotide receptor activity; G protein-coupled receptor activity; signal transducer activity |
| Cellular component | integral component of membrane; plasma membrane; integral component of plasma membrane; endoplasmic reticulum; membrane |
| Biological process | cellular response to organic cyclic compound; negative regulation of adenylate cyclase activity; signal transduction; G protein-coupled purinergic nucleotide receptor signaling pathway; G protein-coupled receptor signaling pathway; biological process |
Sources:Amigo / QuickGO
Orthologs
| Databases | NCBI: entry; OMA: entry |
| Species | Human | Mouse |
| Entrez | 53829 | 74191 |
| Ensembl | ENSG00000181631 | ENSMUSG00000036362 |
| UniProt | Q9BPV8 | Q9D8I2 |
| RefSeq (mRNA) | NM_023914; NM_176894 | NM_028808 |
| RefSeq (protein) | NP_795713 | NP_083084 |
| Location (UCSC) | Chr 3: 151.33 – 151.33 Mb | Chr 3: 59.12 – 59.12 Mb |
| PubMed search |
- Wikidata
| View/Edit Human | View/Edit Mouse |

P2Y purinoceptor 13 is a protein that in humans is encoded by the P2RY13 gene.

The product of this gene, P2Y_{13}, belongs to the family of G-protein coupled receptors. This family has several receptor subtypes with different pharmacological selectivity, which overlaps in some cases, for various adenosine and uridine nucleotides. This receptor is activated by ADP. Two transcript variants encoding the same protein have been identified for this gene.

== See also ==
- P2Y receptor
