= P2RY14 =

Protein-coding gene in the species Homo sapiens

Identifiers
- Aliases: P2RY14, BPR105, GPR105, P2Y14, purinergic receptor P2Y14
- External IDs: OMIM: 610116; MGI: 2155705; GeneCards: P2RY14
Available structures
PDB	Ortholog search: PDBe RCSB
PDB	List of PDB id codes 2B6V

Gene location (Human)
Chr.	Chromosome 3 (human)
Band	3q25.1	Start	151,212,117 bp
Band	3q25.1	End	151,278,542 bp

Gene location (Mouse)
Chr.	Chromosome 3 (mouse)
Band	3 D|3 28.96 cM	Start	59,021,276 bp
Band	3 D|3 28.96 cM	End	59,061,039 bp
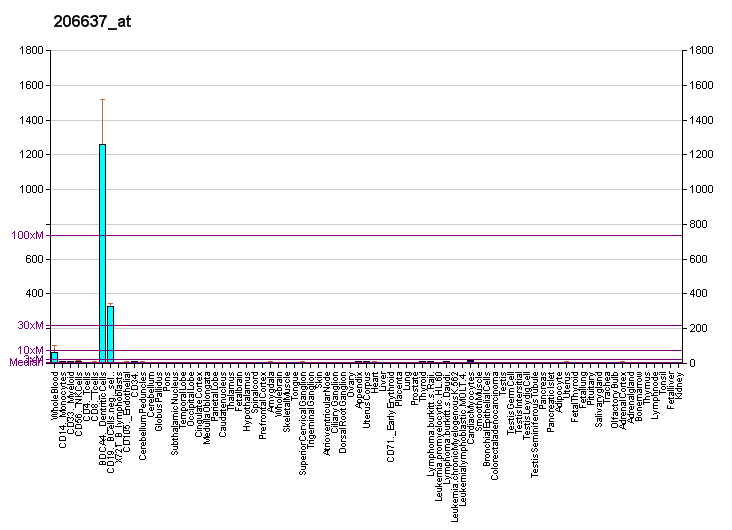
RNA expression pattern
Bgee	Human / Mouse (ortholog); Top expressed in: decidua; skin of hip; endothelial cell; synovial joint; skin of thigh; Achilles tendon; endometrium; gastric mucosa; epithelium of colon; visceral pleura / Top expressed in: cervix; sciatic nerve; spleen; mesenteric lymph nodes; adrenal gland; external carotid artery; left lung lobe; Paneth cell; carotid body; iris; More reference expression data
BioGPS	More reference expression data
Gene ontology
Molecular function	G protein-coupled purinergic nucleotide receptor activity; G protein-coupled UDP receptor activity; G protein-coupled receptor activity; signal transducer activity
Cellular component	integral component of membrane; plasma membrane; integral component of plasma membrane; membrane
Biological process	signal transduction; G protein-coupled purinergic nucleotide receptor signaling pathway; G protein-coupled receptor signaling pathway
Sources:Amigo / QuickGO
Orthologs
Databases	NCBI: entry; OMA: entry
Species	Human	Mouse
Entrez	9934	140795
Ensembl	ENSG00000174944	ENSMUSG00000036381
UniProt	Q15391	Q9ESG6
RefSeq (mRNA)	NM_001081455; NM_014879	NM_001008497; NM_001287119; NM_001287120; NM_001287121; NM_001287122 NM_001287123; NM_001287124; NM_133200
RefSeq (protein)	NP_001074924; NP_055694	NP_001008497; NP_001274048; NP_001274049; NP_001274050; NP_001274051 NP_001274052; NP_001274053; NP_573463
Location (UCSC)	Chr 3: 151.21 – 151.28 Mb	Chr 3: 59.02 – 59.06 Mb
PubMed search
- Wikidata
View/Edit Human	View/Edit Mouse

P2Y purinoceptor 14 is a protein that in humans is encoded by the P2RY14 gene.

The product of this gene, P2Y_{14} belongs to the family of G-protein coupled receptors, which contains several receptor subtypes with different pharmacological selectivity for various adenosine and uridine nucleotides. This receptor is a P2Y purinergic receptor for UDP-glucose and other UDP-sugars coupled to G-proteins. It has been implicated in extending the known immune system functions of P2Y receptors by participating in the regulation of the stem cell compartment, and it may also play a role in neuroimmune function. Two transcript variants encoding the same protein have been identified for this gene.

== See also ==
- P2Y receptor
