= Denufosol =

Chemical compound

Clinical data
- Other names: INS37217; 2'-Desoxycytidine (5')tetraphospho(5')uridine
- Routes of administration: Inhalation
- ATC code: none

Legal status
- Legal status: Investigational

Identifiers
- IUPAC name: [[(3S,5R)-5-(4-amino-2-oxopyrimidin-1-yl)-3-hydroxyoxolan-2-yl]methoxy-hydroxyphosphoryl] [[[(2R,3S,4R,5R)-5-(2,4-dioxopyrimidin-1-yl)-3,4-dihydroxyoxolan-2-yl]methoxy-hydroxyphosphoryl]oxy-hydroxyphosphoryl] hydrogen phosphate
- CAS Number: 211448-85-0
- PubChem CID: 9875516
- ChemSpider: 8051201
- UNII: 5PC250KSSH
- ChEMBL: ChEMBL1767407
- CompTox Dashboard (EPA): DTXSID50870235

Chemical and physical data
- Formula: C_{18}H_{27}N_{5}O_{21}P_{4}
- Molar mass: 773.323 g·mol^{−1}
- 3D model (JSmol): Interactive image
- SMILES: C1[C@@H]([C@H](O[C@H]1N2C=CC(=NC2=O)N)COP(=O)(O)OP(=O)(O)OP(=O)(O)OP(=O)(O)OC[C@@H]3[C@H]([C@H]([C@@H](O3)N4C=CC(=O)NC4=O)O)O)O
- InChI: InChI=1S/C18H27N5O21P4/c19-11-1-3-22(17(28)20-11)13-5-8(24)9(40-13)6-38-45(30,31)42-47(34,35)44-48(36,37)43-46(32,33)39-7-10-14(26)15(27)16(41-10)23-4-2-12(25)21-18(23)29/h1-4,8-10,13-16,24,26-27H,5-7H2,(H,30,31)(H,32,33)(H,34,35)(H,36,37)(H2,19,20,28)(H,21,25,29)/t8-,9+,10+,13+,14+,15+,16+/m0/s1; Key:FPNPSEMJLALQSA-MIYUEGBISA-N

Denufosol is an inhaled drug for the treatment of cystic fibrosis, being developed by Inspire Pharmaceuticals and sponsored by the Cystic Fibrosis Foundation. It was tested in two Phase III clinical trials, TIGER-1 and TIGER-2. Initially, in the first Phase III trial, TIGER-1, the compound showed significant results as compared with placebo. In the second Phase III trial, TIGER-2, the compound did not meet the primary endpoint, a significant change in baseline FEV1 (forced expiratory volume in one second) at the week 48 endpoint as compared to placebo. As of 2011, no additional clinical studies are being conducted with the compound.

The drug was also investigated for the treatment of retinal detachment and other retinal diseases, but trials were terminated in 2006.

== Application ==
In Phase III studies, denufosol was orally inhaled by patients with cystic fibrosis three times a day using a jet nebulizer. To be effective, it had to reach the deeper parts of the lung (bronchioles), making it unsuitable for children under five years of age.

== Mechanism of action ==
Cystic fibrosis is characterised by a defect of the chloride channel CFTR (cystic fibrosis transmembrane conductance regulator) on epithelial cells in the lungs. The CFTR regulates the components of sweat, digestive juices, and mucus. Defects lead to a viscous, dehydrated mucus, hindering mucociliary clearance. Denufosol is an agonist at the P2Y_{2} subtype of purinergic receptors which via its associated G protein leads to activation of alternative chloride channel. Activating this alternate chloride channel theoretically increases ion transport in cystic fibrosis patients which compensates the effects caused by the non-functioning CFTR.

== Chemistry ==
Denufosol consists of two nucleosides (composed of a nucleobase and a sugar each), deoxycytidine and uridine, linked on their sugars by four units of phosphoric acid. It is used in form of its tetrasodium salt.
