= Diquafosol =

Names
- IUPAC name O^{1},O^{7}-Di(5′-deoxyuridin-5′-yl) tetrahydrogen tetraphosphate
- Systematic IUPAC name O^{1},O^{7}-Bis{[(2R,3S,4R,5R)-5-(2,4-dioxo-3,4-dihydropyrimidin-1(2H)-yl)-3,4-dihydroxyoxolan-2-yl]methyl} tetrahydrogen tetraphosphate
- Other names P1,P4-Bis(5'-uridyl) tetraphosphate; INS-365; Diquafosol tetrasodium

Identifiers
CAS Number	59985-21-6; 211427-08-6 (tetrasodium salt)
3D model (JSmol)	Interactive image
ChEMBL	ChEMBL1767408; ChEMBL221326
ChemSpider	130647; 130646 (tetrasodium salt)
IUPHAR/BPS	1736
PubChem CID	148197; 148196 (tetrasodium salt)
UNII	7828VC80FJ; X8T9SBH9LL (tetrasodium salt)
CompTox Dashboard (EPA)	DTXSID40208689
- InChI: InChI=1S/C18H26N4O23P4/c23-9-1-3-21(17(29)19-9)15-13(27)11(25)7(41-15)5-39-46(31,32)43-48(35,36)45-49(37,38)44-47(33,34)40-6-8-12(26)14(28)16(42-8)22-4-2-10(24)20-18(22)30/h1-4,7-8,11-16,25-28H,5-6H2,(H,31,32)(H,33,34)(H,35,36)(H,37,38)(H,19,23,29)(H,20,24,30)/t7-,8-,11-,12-,13-,14-,15-,16-/m1/s1 Key: NMLMACJWHPHKGR-NCOIDOBVSA-N; InChI=1/C18H26N4O23P4/c23-9-1-3-21(17(29)19-9)15-13(27)11(25)7(41-15)5-39-46(31,32)43-48(35,36)45-49(37,38)44-47(33,34)40-6-8-12(26)14(28)16(42-8)22-4-2-10(24)20-18(22)30/h1-4,7-8,11-16,25-28H,5-6H2,(H,31,32)(H,33,34)(H,35,36)(H,37,38)(H,19,23,29)(H,20,24,30)/t7-,8-,11-,12-,13-,14-,15-,16-/m1/s1 Key: NMLMACJWHPHKGR-NCOIDOBVBD
- SMILES: O=C1\C=C/N(C(=O)N1)[C@@H]2O[C@@H]([C@@H](O)[C@H]2O)COP(=O)(O)OP(=O)(O)OP(=O)(O)OP(=O)(O)OC[C@H]4O[C@@H](N\3C(=O)NC(=O)/C=C/3)[C@H](O)[C@@H]4O

Properties
Chemical formula	C_{18}H_{26}N_{4}O_{23}P_{4}
Molar mass	790.306 g·mol^{−1}

Pharmacology
ATC code	S01XA33 (WHO)
- Except where otherwise noted, data are given for materials in their standard state (at 25 °C [77 °F], 100 kPa). Infobox references

Diquafosol (tradename Diquas) is a pharmaceutical drug for the treatment of dry eye disease. It was approved for use in Japan in 2010. It is formulated as a 3% ophthalmic solution of the tetrasodium salt.

Its mechanism of action involves agonism of the P2Y2 purinergic receptor.
