= P2RY8 =

Protein-coding gene in the species Homo sapiens

Identifiers
- Aliases: P2RY8, P2Y8, purinergic receptor P2Y8, P2Y receptor family member 8
- External IDs: OMIM: 300525; GeneCards: P2RY8

Gene location (Human)
Chr.	X chromosome (human)
Band	X;Y	Start	1,462,581 bp
Band	X;Y	End	1,537,185 bp
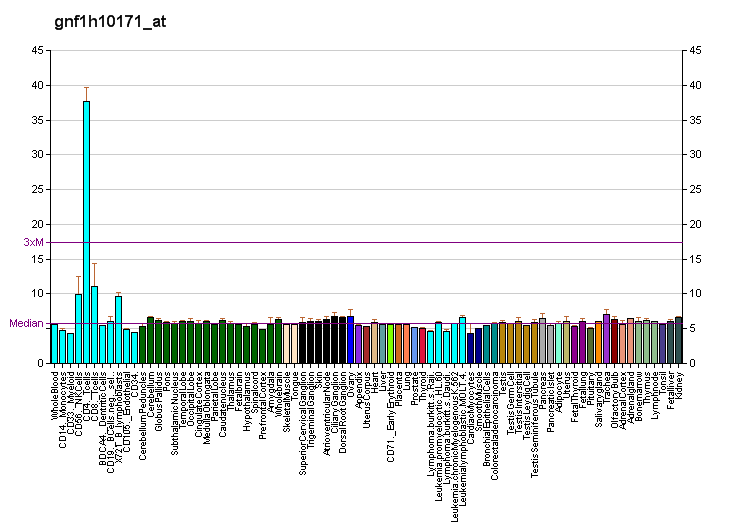

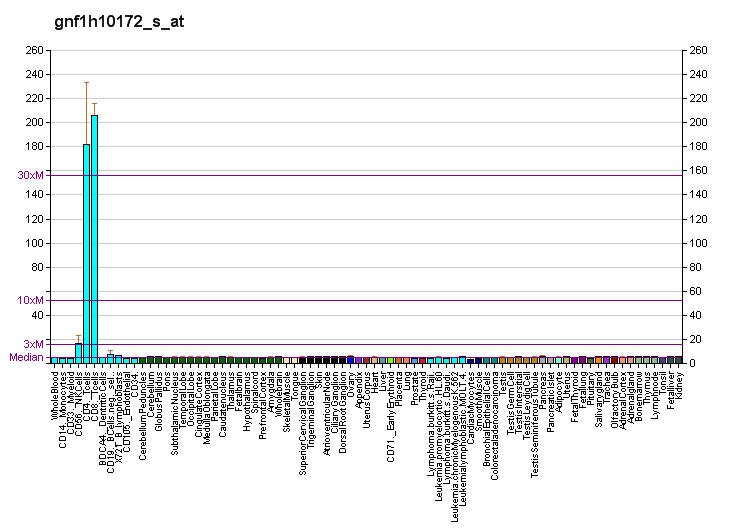
RNA expression pattern
Bgee	Human / Mouse (ortholog); Top expressed in: buccal mucosa cell; granulocyte; blood; bone marrow cell; monocyte; lymph node; trabecular bone; epithelium of nasopharynx; appendix; mucosa of ileum / n/a; More reference expression data
BioGPS	More reference expression data
Gene ontology
Molecular function	G protein-coupled purinergic nucleotide receptor activity; signal transducer activity; G protein-coupled receptor activity
Cellular component	integral component of membrane; plasma membrane; membrane; integral component of plasma membrane
Biological process	G protein-coupled receptor signaling pathway; signal transduction; G protein-coupled purinergic nucleotide receptor signaling pathway; positive regulation of Rho protein signal transduction; positive regulation of cytosolic calcium ion concentration involved in phospholipase C-activating G protein-coupled signaling pathway
Sources:Amigo / QuickGO
Orthologs
Databases	NCBI: entry; OMA: entry
Species	Human	Mouse
Entrez	286530	n/a
Ensembl	ENSG00000182162	n/a
UniProt	Q86VZ1	n/a
RefSeq (mRNA)	NM_178129	n/a
RefSeq (protein)	NP_835230	n/a
Location (UCSC)	Chr X: 1.46 – 1.54 Mb	n/a
PubMed search		n/a
- Wikidata
View/Edit Human

P2Y purinoceptor 8 is a protein that in humans is encoded by the P2RY8 gene.

== Function ==
The protein encoded by this gene belongs to the family of G-protein coupled receptors, that are preferentially activated by adenosine and uridine nucleotides. This gene is moderately expressed in undifferentiated HL60 cells, and is located on both chromosomes X and Y.

== Clinical relevance ==
Recurrent mutations in this gene have been associated to cases of diffuse large B-cell lymphoma.

== See also ==
- P2Y receptor
