= Non-noradrenergic, non-cholinergic transmitter =

Group of signaling molecules in the gut

A non-noradrenergic, non-cholinergic transmitter (NANC) is a neurotransmitter of the enteric nervous system (ENS) that is neither acetylcholine, norepinephrine, nor epinephrine.

== Comparison table ==
This table compares different NANCs in the PNS:

Neurotransmitter	Type	Location	Function
ATP	non-peptide	postganglionic sympathetic neurons (e.g. in blood vessels & vas deferens)	Fast depolarization/contraction (vasoconstriction)
GABA	non-peptide	ENSs	peristalsis
5-HT	non-peptide	ENSs	peristalsis
dopamine	non-peptide	some SNSs (e.g. kidney)	vasodilation
NO	non-peptide	gastric nerves & Pelvic Nerve	erection; gastric emptying
NPY	peptide	postganglionic sympathetic neurons (e.g. blood vessels)	enhance vasoconstrictor action of noradrenaline; noradrenaline release inhibitor
VIP	peptide	parasympathetic nerves to salivary glands; NANC innervation to smooth muscle of airways; parasympathetic ganglia in sphincters, gallbladder and small intestine	vasodilation; acetylcholine cotransmitter; bronchodilation; relaxation of intestinal smooth muscle and sphincters
GnRH	peptide	sympathetic ganglia	slow depolarization; acetylcholine cotransmitter
substance P	peptide	sympathetic ganglia; ENSs	slow depolarization; acetylcholine cotransmitter
CGRP	peptide	non-myelinated sensory neurons	vasodilation; increase vascular permeability; neurogenic inflammation
