= DORN1 =

Purinergic receptor

L-type lectin-domain containing receptor kinase I.9

Identifiers
- Organism: Arabidopsis thaliana
- Symbol: LECRK19
- Alt. symbols: DORN1, LecRK-I.9
- Entrez: 836152
- RefSeq (Prot): NP_001078773.1
- UniProt: Q9LSR8

Other data
- Chromosome: 5: 24.26 - 24.27 Mb
Search for
- Structures: Swiss-model
- Domains: InterPro

DORN1 refers to a purinergic receptor found in green plants, which is involved in extracellular ATP detection. Through the process of signal transduction, DORN1 couples extracellular ATP binding (which occurs during cellular stress) to downstream signalling and ultimately gene expression, which is thought to aid in plant survival.

== Molecular properties ==
In contrast to animal purinergic receptors (which are G protein-coupled receptors), DORN1 is a lectin receptor kinase (LecRK), and is part of the L type lectin receptor kinases, due to its legume-like extracellular domain.

In green plants such as Arabidopsis thaliana, several mutants lacking the DORN1 receptors are unable to phosphorylate mitogen-activated protein kinases after ATP stimulation.

== Function ==
DORN1 receptors may play a role in mediating wound-induced inflammatory responses in green plants, with ATP acting as a damage-associated molecular pattern molecule. In response to cell lysis, ATP is discharged and binds onto the extracellular lectin domain of the DORN1 receptor. The intracellular DORN1 kinase domain is subsequently activated, resulting in several cellular responses such as mitogen-activated protein kinase activation, increased cytosolic calcium concentration and reactive oxygen species (ROS) production, ultimately leading to the induction of defence gene expression.

== See also ==
- Plant perception (physiology)
- Receptor protein serine/threonine kinase
