= P2RY4 =

Protein-coding gene in the species Homo sapiens

Identifiers
- Aliases: P2RY4, NRU, P2P, P2Y4, UNR, pyrimidinergic receptor P2Y4
- External IDs: OMIM: 300038; MGI: 1926594; GeneCards: P2RY4
Available structures
PDB	Ortholog search: PDBe RCSB
PDB	List of PDB id codes 2B6Q

Gene location (Human)
Chr.	X chromosome (human)
Band	Xq13.1	Start	70,258,166 bp
Band	Xq13.1	End	70,260,204 bp

Gene location (Mouse)
Chr.	X chromosome (mouse)
Band	X|X C3	Start	99,633,760 bp
Band	X|X C3	End	99,638,475 bp
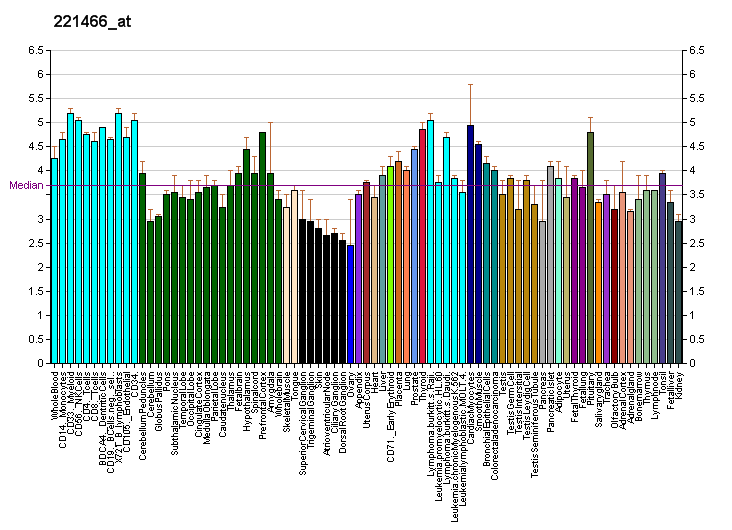
RNA expression pattern
Bgee	Human / Mouse (ortholog); Top expressed in: tibialis anterior muscle; mucosa of ileum; optic nerve; deltoid muscle; skin of abdomen; rectum; skin of limb; skin of leg; skin of hip; transverse colon / Top expressed in: esophagus; right ventricle; lip; tibiofemoral joint; digastric muscle; gastrula; carotid body; liver; jejunum; zone of skin; More reference expression data
BioGPS	More reference expression data
Gene ontology
Molecular function	G protein-coupled purinergic nucleotide receptor activity; G protein-coupled UTP receptor activity; ATP binding; G protein-coupled receptor activity; signal transducer activity
Cellular component	integral component of membrane; plasma membrane; basolateral plasma membrane; integral component of plasma membrane; apical plasma membrane; membrane; glutamatergic synapse; integral component of presynaptic active zone membrane
Biological process	positive regulation of cytosolic calcium ion concentration; phospholipase C-activating G protein-coupled receptor signaling pathway; transepithelial chloride transport; signal transduction; G protein-coupled purinergic nucleotide receptor signaling pathway; cellular response to prostaglandin E stimulus; G protein-coupled receptor signaling pathway; cellular response to ATP; regulation of presynaptic cytosolic calcium ion concentration; regulation of synaptic vesicle exocytosis
Sources:Amigo / QuickGO
Orthologs
Databases	NCBI: entry; OMA: entry
Species	Human	Mouse
Entrez	5030	57385
Ensembl	ENSG00000186912	ENSMUSG00000044359
UniProt	P51582	Q9JJS7
RefSeq (mRNA)	NM_002565	NM_020621
RefSeq (protein)	NP_002556	NP_065646
Location (UCSC)	Chr X: 70.26 – 70.26 Mb	Chr X: 99.63 – 99.64 Mb
PubMed search
- Wikidata
View/Edit Human	View/Edit Mouse

P2Y purinoceptor 4 is a protein that in humans is encoded by the P2RY4 gene.

The product of this gene, P2Y_{4}, belongs to the family of G-protein coupled receptors. This family has several receptor subtypes with different pharmacological selectivity, which overlaps in some cases, for various adenosine and uridine nucleotides. This receptor is responsive to uridine nucleotides, partially responsive to ATP, and not responsive to ADP.

== See also ==
- P2Y receptor
