= P2RY1 =

Protein-coding gene in the species Homo sapiens

Identifiers
- Aliases: P2RY1, P2Y1, purinergic receptor P2Y1, SARCC
- External IDs: OMIM: 601167; MGI: 105049; GeneCards: P2RY1
Available structures
PDB	Ortholog search: PDBe RCSB
PDB	List of PDB id codes 4XNV, 4XNW

Gene location (Human)
Chr.	Chromosome 3 (human)
Band	3q25.2	Start	152,835,131 bp
Band	3q25.2	End	152,841,439 bp

Gene location (Mouse)
Chr.	Chromosome 3 (mouse)
Band	3|3 E1	Start	60,910,216 bp
Band	3|3 E1	End	60,916,403 bp
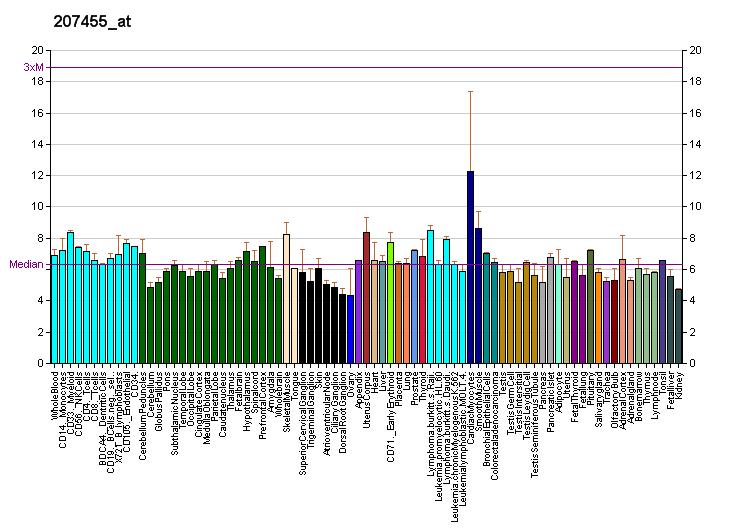
RNA expression pattern
Bgee	Human / Mouse (ortholog); Top expressed in: gingival epithelium; endothelial cell; oral cavity; internal globus pallidus; visceral pleura; amniotic fluid; placenta; nucleus accumbens; tibia; lower lobe of lung / Top expressed in: lumbar spinal ganglion; duodenum; islet of Langerhans; granulocyte; jejunum; esophagus; lip; muscle of thigh; embryo; right kidney; More reference expression data
BioGPS	More reference expression data
Gene ontology
Molecular function	A1 adenosine receptor binding; G protein-coupled receptor activity; scaffold protein binding; ADP binding; G protein-coupled purinergic nucleotide receptor activity; signal transducer activity; protein binding; protein heterodimerization activity; G protein-coupled ATP receptor activity; ATP binding; nucleotide binding; signaling receptor activity
Cellular component	cell body; integral component of membrane; postsynaptic membrane; membrane; plasma membrane; integral component of plasma membrane; cell surface; dendrite; basolateral plasma membrane; apical plasma membrane; mitochondrion; postsynaptic density; glutamatergic synapse; integral component of presynaptic active zone membrane; cilium
Biological process	hemostasis; cellular response to organic cyclic compound; G protein-coupled adenosine receptor signaling pathway; positive regulation of protein phosphorylation; adenylate cyclase-inhibiting G protein-coupled receptor signaling pathway; eating behavior; positive regulation of cytosolic calcium ion concentration; response to mechanical stimulus; ageing; regulation of signaling receptor activity; negative regulation of norepinephrine secretion; signal transduction involved in regulation of gene expression; wound healing; G protein-coupled purinergic nucleotide receptor signaling pathway; phospholipase C-activating G protein-coupled receptor signaling pathway; cell surface receptor signaling pathway; positive regulation of inositol trisphosphate biosynthetic process; negative regulation of binding; positive regulation of ion transport; positive regulation of ERK1 and ERK2 cascade; sensory perception of pain; response to growth factor; positive regulation of penile erection; protein localization to plasma membrane; positive regulation of hormone secretion; relaxation of muscle; positive regulation of transcription by RNA polymerase II; glial cell migration; signal transduction; blood coagulation; platelet activation; blood vessel diameter maintenance; G protein-coupled receptor signaling pathway; regulation of cell shape; cellular response to ATP; cellular response to purine-containing compound; regulation of presynaptic cytosolic calcium ion concentration; regulation of synaptic vesicle exocytosis
Sources:Amigo / QuickGO
Orthologs
Databases	NCBI: entry; OMA: entry
Species	Human	Mouse
Entrez	5028	18441
Ensembl	ENSG00000169860	ENSMUSG00000027765
UniProt	P47900	P49650
RefSeq (mRNA)	NM_002563	NM_001282016; NM_008772
RefSeq (protein)	NP_002554	NP_001268945; NP_032798
Location (UCSC)	Chr 3: 152.84 – 152.84 Mb	Chr 3: 60.91 – 60.92 Mb
PubMed search
- Wikidata
View/Edit Human	View/Edit Mouse

P2Y purinoceptor 1 is a protein that in humans is encoded by the P2RY1 gene.

== Function ==
The product of this gene, P2Y_{1} belongs to the family of G-protein coupled receptors. This family has several receptor subtypes with different pharmacological selectivity, which overlaps in some cases, for various adenosine and uridine nucleotides. This receptor functions as a receptor for extracellular ATP and ADP. In platelets binding to ADP leads to mobilization of intracellular calcium ions via activation of phospholipase C, a change in platelet shape, and probably to platelet aggregation.

== See also ==
- P2Y receptor
