= LPAR4 =

Protein-coding gene in the species Homo sapiens

Identifiers
- Aliases: LPAR4, GPR23, LPA4, P2RY9, P2Y5-LIKE, P2Y9, lysophosphatidic acid receptor 4
- External IDs: OMIM: 300086; MGI: 1925384; GeneCards: LPAR4

Gene location (Human)
Chr.	X chromosome (human)
Band	Xq21.1	Start	78,747,709 bp
Band	Xq21.1	End	78,758,714 bp

Gene location (Mouse)
Chr.	X chromosome (mouse)
Band	X|X D	Start	105,964,231 bp
Band	X|X D	End	105,977,506 bp
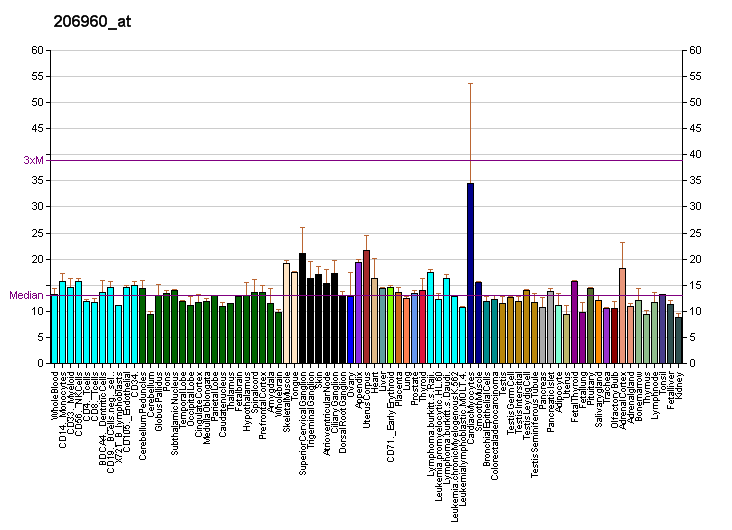
RNA expression pattern
Bgee	Human / Mouse (ortholog); Top expressed in: sural nerve; buccal mucosa cell; tibia; testicle; gonad; ventricular zone; cartilage tissue; ganglionic eminence; muscle of thigh; Achilles tendon / Top expressed in: dermis; pituitary stalk; efferent ductule; human fetus; primitive streak; trigeminal ganglion; tongue; Gonadal ridge; mandibular prominence; left lung lobe; More reference expression data
BioGPS	More reference expression data
Gene ontology
Molecular function	lysophosphatidic acid binding; signal transducer activity; lipid binding; G protein-coupled receptor activity; lysophosphatidic acid receptor activity
Cellular component	integral component of membrane; membrane; integral component of plasma membrane; plasma membrane; nuclear body; intracellular membrane-bounded organelle
Biological process	signal transduction; positive regulation of Rho protein signal transduction; positive regulation of cytosolic calcium ion concentration involved in phospholipase C-activating G protein-coupled signaling pathway; G protein-coupled receptor signaling pathway
Sources:Amigo / QuickGO
Orthologs
Databases	NCBI: entry; OMA: entry
Species	Human	Mouse
Entrez	2846	78134
Ensembl	ENSG00000147145	ENSMUSG00000049929
UniProt	Q99677	Q8BLG2
RefSeq (mRNA)	NM_001278000; NM_005296	NM_175271
RefSeq (protein)	NP_001264929; NP_005287	NP_780480
Location (UCSC)	Chr X: 78.75 – 78.76 Mb	Chr X: 105.96 – 105.98 Mb
PubMed search
- Wikidata
View/Edit Human	View/Edit Mouse

Lysophosphatidic acid receptor 4 also known as LPA_{4} is a protein that in humans is encoded by the LPAR4 gene. LPA_{4} is a G protein-coupled receptor that binds the lipid signaling molecule lysophosphatidic acid (LPA).

== See also ==
- Lysophospholipid receptor
- P2Y receptor
