= P2 receptor =

Class of cell surface receptors for purines

P2 receptor may refer to:

Nucleotides, if released into the extracellular environment, can lead to cell death or other harmful cellular consequences. To avoid cellular damage, nucleotides should be neutralized, which is accomplished by P2 receptors. Almost every cell type expresses P2 receptors. Purinergic signalling also has a pathophysiological role in several immune cells including calcium mobilization, actin polymerization, chemotaxis, the release of mediators, cell maturation, cytotoxicity, and cell death etc.

Depending on the nature of the receptor they are found to be of two types:

- P2Y receptors (metabotropic)
- P2X receptors (ionotropic)

P is for purinergic, P2 refers to ATP receptors, as opposed to P1 adenosine adenosine receptors. P2X receptors are ATP activated channels that allow the passage of ions across cell membranes. P2Y receptors are ATP activated G protein-coupled receptors (GPCRs) that initiate an intracellular chain of reactions.

Extracellular ATP and the related purine and pyrimidine nucleotides exert their functions via signalling through membrane-bound purinergic P2 receptors. These receptors are widely expressed throughout the body on various immune and nonimmune cells. P2X receptors are ionotropic receptors while P2Y are GPCR type receptors. P2X receptor family encompasses 7 genes. P2Y family has 8 receptors that can be divided into two sub-families depending upon the structural similarity. P2X receptors are activated with ATP while P2Y receptors are activated by diphosphates, triphosphates, purines, pyrimidines, etc.
