= P2RY2 =

Protein-coding gene in the species Homo sapiens

Identifiers
- Aliases: P2RY2, HP2U, P2RU1, P2U, P2U1, P2UR, P2Y2, P2Y2R, purinergic receptor P2Y2
- External IDs: OMIM: 600041; MGI: 105107; GeneCards: P2RY2
Available structures
PDB	Ortholog search: PDBe RCSB
PDB	List of PDB id codes 1Z8E

Gene location (Human)
Chr.	Chromosome 11 (human)
Band	11q13.4	Start	73,218,281 bp
Band	11q13.4	End	73,242,427 bp

Gene location (Mouse)
Chr.	Chromosome 7 (mouse)
Band	7|7 E2	Start	100,645,775 bp
Band	7|7 E2	End	100,662,073 bp
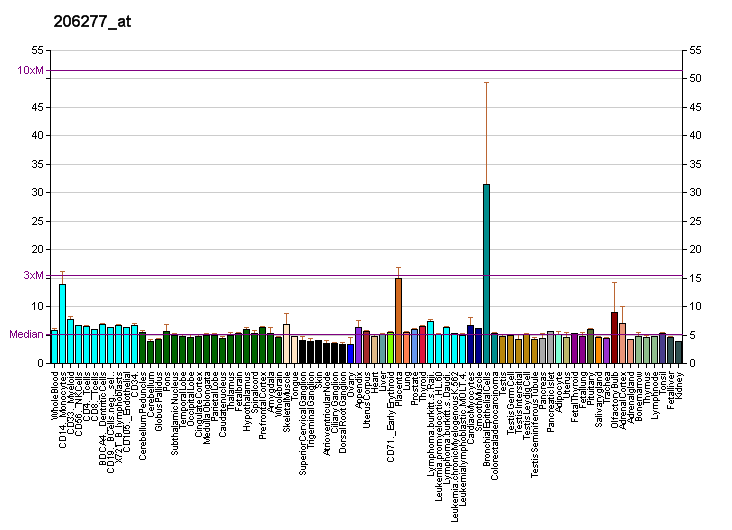
RNA expression pattern
Bgee	Human / Mouse (ortholog); Top expressed in: muscle of thigh; gastrocnemius muscle; Skeletal muscle tissue of rectus abdominis; mucosa of esophagus; vastus lateralis muscle; biceps brachii; Skeletal muscle tissue of biceps brachii; deltoid muscle; gingival epithelium; triceps brachii muscle / Top expressed in: muscle of thigh; extensor digitorum longus muscle; corneal stroma; plantaris muscle; granulocyte; soleus muscle; interventricular septum; skeletal muscle tissue; digastric muscle; thoracic diaphragm; More reference expression data
BioGPS	More reference expression data
Gene ontology
Molecular function	G protein-coupled receptor activity; G protein-coupled purinergic nucleotide receptor activity; signal transducer activity; signaling receptor activity
Cellular component	integral component of membrane; membrane; integral component of plasma membrane; plasma membrane
Biological process	G protein-coupled purinergic nucleotide receptor signaling pathway; phospholipase C-activating G protein-coupled receptor signaling pathway; cellular ion homeostasis; positive regulation of mucus secretion; signal transduction; blood vessel diameter maintenance; G protein-coupled receptor signaling pathway; cellular response to ATP
Sources:Amigo / QuickGO
Orthologs
Databases	NCBI: entry; OMA: entry
Species	Human	Mouse
Entrez	5029	18442
Ensembl	ENSG00000175591	ENSMUSG00000032860
UniProt	P41231	P35383
RefSeq (mRNA)	NM_002564; NM_176071; NM_176072	NM_008773; NM_001302346; NM_001302347
RefSeq (protein)	NP_002555; NP_788085; NP_788086	NP_001289275; NP_001289276; NP_032799
Location (UCSC)	Chr 11: 73.22 – 73.24 Mb	Chr 7: 100.65 – 100.66 Mb
PubMed search
- Wikidata
View/Edit Human	View/Edit Mouse

P2Y purinoceptor 2 is a protein that in humans is encoded by the P2RY2 gene.

The product of this gene, P2Y_{2} belongs to the family of G-protein coupled receptors. This family has several receptor subtypes with different pharmacological selectivity, which overlaps in some cases, for various adenosine and uridine nucleotides. This receptor is responsive to both adenosine and uridine nucleotides. It may participate in control of the cell cycle of endometrial carcinoma cells. Three transcript variants encoding the same protein have been identified for this gene.

== See also ==
- P2Y receptor
- Denufosol, a P2Y_{2} agonist
