= Uridine triphosphate =

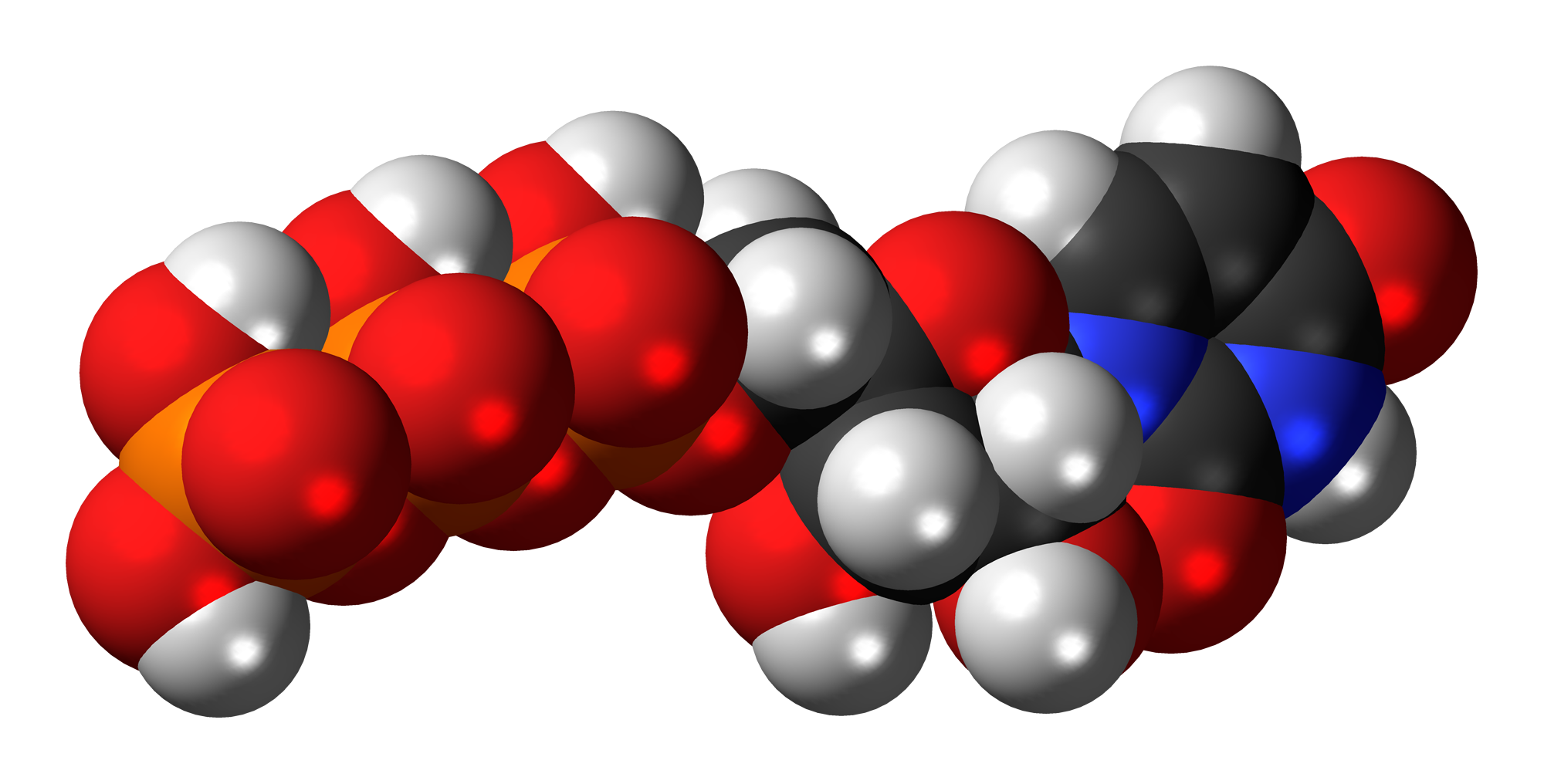

Names
- IUPAC name Uridine 5′-(tetrahydrogen triphosphate)
- Systematic IUPAC name O^{1}-{[(2R,3S,4R,5R)-5-(2,4-Dioxo-3,4-dihydropyrimidin-1(2H)-yl)-3,4-dihydroxyoxolan-2-yl]methyl} tetrahydrogen triphosphate

Identifiers
CAS Number	63-39-8
3D model (JSmol)	Interactive image
Beilstein Reference	71520
ChEBI	CHEBI:15713
ChEMBL	ChEMBL336296
ChemSpider	5903
DrugBank	DB04005
ECHA InfoCard	100.000.508
EC Number	200-558-7
Gmelin Reference	307896
MeSH	Uridine+triphosphate
PubChem CID	6133
UNII	UT0S826Z60
CompTox Dashboard (EPA)	DTXSID0041147
- InChI: InChI=1S/C9H15N2O15P3/c12-5-1-2-11(9(15)10-5)8-7(14)6(13)4(24-8)3-23-28(19,20)26-29(21,22)25-27(16,17)18/h1-2,4,6-8,13-14H,3H2,(H,19,20)(H,21,22)(H,10,12,15)(H2,16,17,18)/t4-,6-,7-,8-/m1/s1 Key: PGAVKCOVUIYSFO-XVFCMESISA-N
- SMILES: O[C@@H]1[C@@H](COP(O)(=O)OP(O)(=O)OP(O)(O)=O)O[C@H]([C@@H]1O)n1ccc(=O)[nH]c1=O

Properties
Chemical formula	C_{9}H_{15}N_{2}O_{15}P_{3}
Molar mass	484.139 g·mol^{−1}
- Except where otherwise noted, data are given for materials in their standard state (at 25 °C [77 °F], 100 kPa). verify (what is ?) Infobox references

Uridine-5′-triphosphate (UTP) is a pyrimidine nucleoside triphosphate, consisting of the organic base uracil linked to the 1′ carbon of the ribose sugar, and esterified with tri-phosphoric acid at the 5′ position. Its main role is as substrate for the synthesis of RNA during transcription. UTP is the precursor for the production of CTP via CTP synthetase. UTP can be biosynthesized from UDP by nucleoside-diphosphate kinase after using the phosphate group from ATP. UDP + ATP ⇌ UTP + ADP; both UTP and ATP are energetically equal.

The homologue in DNA is thymidine triphosphate (TTP or dTTP). UTP also has a deoxyribose form (dUTP).

== Role in metabolism ==
UTP also has the role of a source of energy or an activator of substrates in metabolic reactions, like that of ATP, but more specific. When UTP activates a substrate (such as glucose-1-phosphate), UDP-glucose is formed and inorganic phosphate is released. UDP-glucose enters the synthesis of glycogen. UTP is used in the metabolism of galactose, where the activated form UDP-galactose is converted to UDP-glucose. UDP-glucuronate is used to conjugate bilirubin to a more water-soluble bilirubin diglucuronide. UTP is also used to activate amino sugars like glucosamine-1-phosphate to UDP-glucosamine, and N-acetyl-glucosamine-1-phosphate to UDP-N-acetylglucosamine.

== Role in receptor mediation ==
UTP also has roles in mediating responses by extracellular binding to the P2Y receptors of cells. UTP and its derivatives are still being investigated for their applications in human medicine. However, there is evidence from various model systems to suggest it has applications in pathogen defense and injury repair. In mice UTP has been found to interact with P2Y4 receptors to mediate an enhancement in antibody production. In schwannoma cells, UTP binds to the P2YP receptors in the event of damage. This leads to the downstream signal cascade that leads to the eventual injury repair.

== See also ==
- CTP synthase
