= Adenosine diphosphate =

- Skeletal formula of ADP

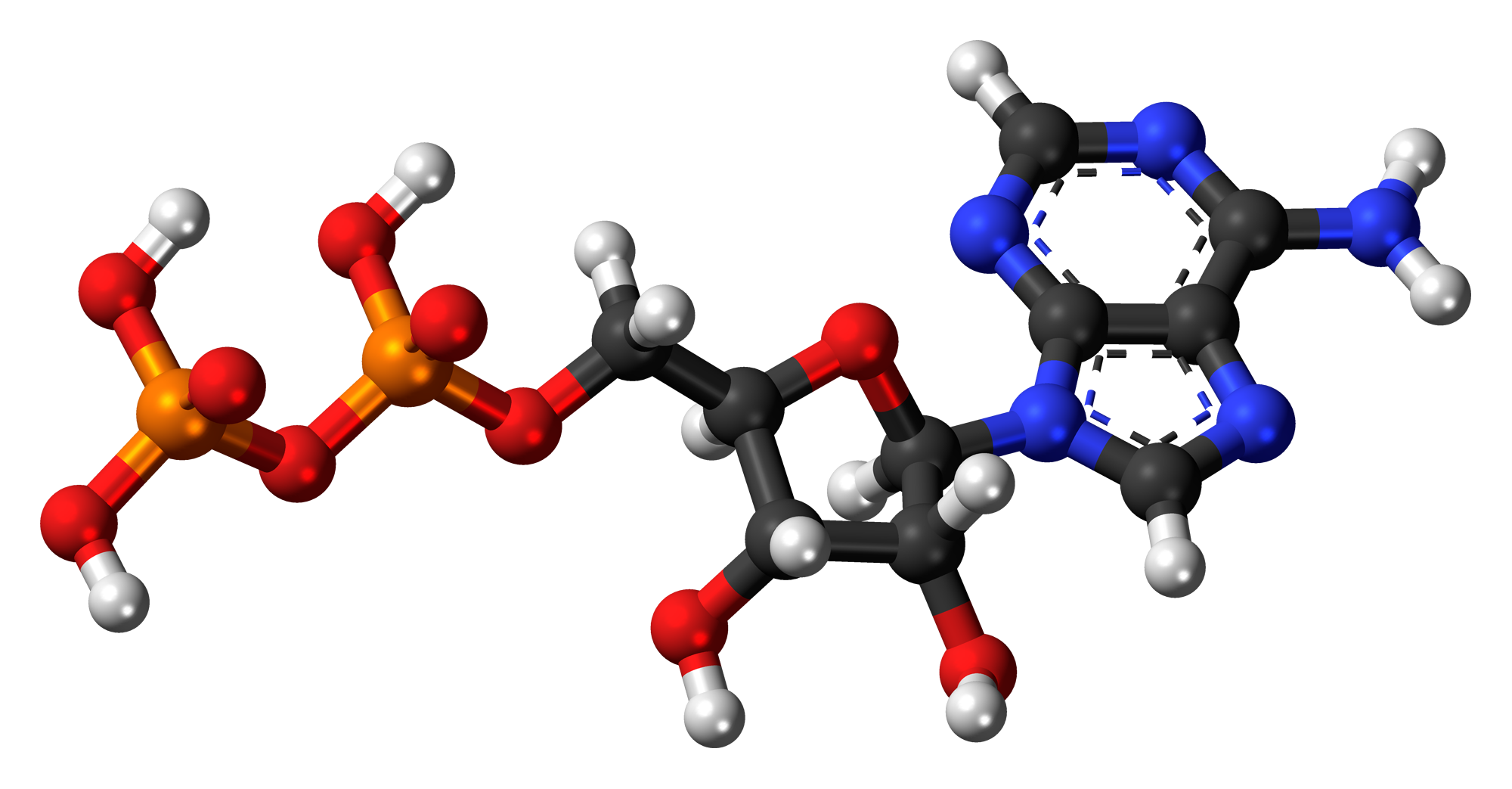
- Ball-and-stick model of ADP (shown here as a 3- ion)

Names
- IUPAC name Adenosine 5′-(trihydrogen diphosphate)
- Systematic IUPAC name [(2R,3S,4R,5R)-5-(6-Amino-9H-purin-9-yl)-3,4-dihydroxyoxolan-2-yl]methyl trihydrogen diphosphate
- Other names Adenosine 5′-diphosphate; Adenosine 5′-pyrophosphate; Adenosine pyrophosphate

Identifiers
CAS Number	58-64-0
3D model (JSmol)	Interactive image; Interactive image
ChEBI	CHEBI:16761
ChEMBL	ChEMBL14830
ChemSpider	5800
DrugBank	DB03431
ECHA InfoCard	100.000.356
EC Number	218-249-0
IUPHAR/BPS	1712
KEGG	C00008
PubChem CID	6022
RTECS number	AU7467000
UNII	61D2G4IYVH
CompTox Dashboard (EPA)	DTXSID60883210
- InChI: InChI=1S/C10H15N5O10P2/c11-8-5-9(13-2-12-8)15(3-14-5)10-7(17)6(16)4(24-10)1-23-27(21,22)25-26(18,19)20/h2-4,6-7,10,16-17H,1H2,(H,21,22)(H2,11,12,13)(H2,18,19,20)/t4-,6-,7-,10-/m1/s1 Key: XTWYTFMLZFPYCI-KQYNXXCUSA-N; InChI=1/C10H15N5O10P2/c11-8-5-9(13-2-12-8)15(3-14-5)10-7(17)6(16)4(24-10)1-23-27(21,22)25-26(18,19)20/h2-4,6-7,10,16-17H,1H2,(H,21,22)(H2,11,12,13)(H2,18,19,20)/t4-,6-,7-,10-/m1/s1 Key: XTWYTFMLZFPYCI-KQYNXXCUBP
- SMILES: O=P(O)(O)OP(=O)(O)OC[C@H]3O[C@@H](n2cnc1c(ncnc12)N)[C@H](O)[C@@H]3O; c1nc(c2c(n1)n(cn2)[C@H]3[C@@H]([C@@H]([C@H](O3)COP(=O)(O)OP(=O)(O)O)O)O)N

Properties
Chemical formula	C_{10}H_{15}N_{5}O_{10}P_{2}
Molar mass	427.203 g·mol^{−1}
Density	2.49 g/mL
log P	−2.640

Hazards
Safety data sheet (SDS)	MSDS
- Except where otherwise noted, data are given for materials in their standard state (at 25 °C [77 °F], 100 kPa). verify (what is ?) Infobox references

Adenosine diphosphate (ADP), also known as adenosine pyrophosphate (APP), is an important organic compound in metametabolism and is essential to the flow of energy in living cells. ADP consists of three important structural components: a sugar backbone attached to adenine and two phosphate groups bonded to the 5-carbon atom of ribose. The diphosphate group of ADP is attached to the 5' carbon of the sugar backbone, while the adenine attaches to the 1' carbon.

ADP can be interconverted to adenosine triphosphate (ATP) and adenosine monophosphate (AMP). ATP contains one more phosphate group than ADP, while AMP contains one fewer phosphate group. Energy transfer used by all living things is a result of dephosphorylation of ATP by enzymes known as ATPases. The cleavage of a phosphate group from ATP results in the coupling of energy to metabolic reactions and a by-product of ADP. ATP is continually reformed from lower-energy species ADP and AMP. The biosynthesis of ATP is achieved throughout processes such as substrate-level phosphorylation, oxidative phosphorylation, and photophosphorylation, all of which facilitate the addition of a phosphate group to ADP.

== Bioenergetics ==
ADP cycling supplies the energy needed to do work in a biological system, the thermodynamic process of transferring energy from one source to another. There are two types of energy: potential energy and kinetic energy. Potential energy can be thought of as stored energy, or usable energy that is available to do work. Kinetic energy is the energy of an object as a result of its motion. The significance of ATP is in its ability to store potential energy within the phosphate bonds. The energy stored between these bonds can then be transferred to do work. For example, the transfer of energy from ATP to the protein myosin causes a conformational change when connecting to actin during muscle contraction.

The cycle of synthesis and degradation of ATP; 1 and 2 represent output and input of energy, respectively.

It takes multiple reactions between myosin and actin to effectively produce one muscle contraction, and, therefore, the availability of large amounts of ATP is required to produce each muscle contraction. For this reason, biological processes have evolved to produce efficient ways to replenish the potential energy of ATP from ADP.

Breaking one of ATP's phosphorus bonds generates approximately 30.5 kilojoules per mole of ATP (7.3 kcal). ADP can be converted, or powered back to ATP through the process of releasing the chemical energy available in food; in humans, this is constantly performed via aerobic respiration in the mitochondria. Plants use photosynthetic pathways to convert and store energy from sunlight, also conversion of ADP to ATP. Animals use the energy released in the breakdown of glucose and other molecules to convert ADP to ATP, which can then be used to fuel necessary growth and cell maintenance.

== Cellular respiration ==
=== Catabolism ===
The ten-step catabolic pathway of glycolysis is the initial phase of free-energy release in the breakdown of glucose and can be split into two phases, the preparatory phase and payoff phase. ADP and phosphate are needed as precursors to synthesize ATP in the payoff reactions of the TCA cycle and oxidative phosphorylation mechanism. During the payoff phase of glycolysis, the enzymes phosphoglycerate kinase and pyruvate kinase facilitate the addition of a phosphate group to ADP by way of substrate-level phosphorylation.

Glycolysis overview

=== Glycolysis ===
Glycolysis is performed by all living organisms and consists of 10 steps. The net reaction for the overall process of glycolysis is:

Glucose + 2 NAD+ + 2 P_{i} + 2 ADP → 2 pyruvate + 2 ATP + 2 NADH + 2 H_{2}O

Steps 1 and 3 require the input of energy derived from the hydrolysis of ATP to ADP and P_{i} (inorganic phosphate), whereas steps 7 and 10 require the input of ADP, each yielding ATP. The enzymes necessary to break down glucose are found in the cytoplasm, the viscous fluid that fills living cells, where the glycolytic reactions take place.

=== Citric acid cycle ===
The citric acid cycle, also known as the Krebs cycle or the TCA (tricarboxylic acid) cycle is an 8-step process that takes the pyruvate generated by glycolysis and generates 4 NADH, FADH2, and GTP, which is further converted to ATP. It is only in step 5, where GTP is generated, by succinyl-CoA synthetase, and then converted to ATP, that ADP is used (GTP + ADP → GDP + ATP).

=== Oxidative phosphorylation ===
Oxidative phosphorylation produces 26 of the 30 equivalents of ATP generated in cellular respiration by transferring electrons from NADH or FADH2 to O_{2} through electron carriers. The energy released when electrons are passed from higher-energy NADH or FADH2 to the lower-energy O_{2} is required to phosphorylate ADP and once again generate ATP. It is this energy coupling and phosphorylation of ADP to ATP that gives the electron transport chain the name oxidative phosphorylation.

ATP-Synthase

==== Mitochondrial ATP synthase complex ====
During the initial phases of glycolysis and the TCA cycle, cofactors such as NAD+ donate and accept electrons that aid in the electron transport chain's ability to produce a proton gradient across the inner mitochondrial membrane. The ATP synthase complex exists within the mitochondrial membrane (F_{O} portion) and protrudes into the matrix (F_{1} portion). The energy derived as a result of the chemical gradient is then used to synthesize ATP by coupling the reaction of inorganic phosphate to ADP in the active site of the ATP synthase enzyme; the equation for this can be written as ADP + P_{i} → ATP.

== Blood platelet activation ==
Under normal conditions, small disk-shape platelets circulate in the blood freely and without interaction with one another. ADP is stored in dense bodies inside blood platelets and is released upon platelet activation. ADP interacts with a family of ADP receptors found on platelets (P2Y1, P2Y12, and P2X1), which leads to platelet activation.

- P2Y1 receptors initiate platelet aggregation and shape change as a result of interactions with ADP.
- P2Y12 receptors further amplify the response to ADP and draw forth the completion of aggregation.

ADP in the blood is converted to adenosine by the action of ecto-ADPases, inhibiting further platelet activation via adenosine receptors.

== See also ==
- Nucleoside
- Nucleotide
- DNA
- RNA
- Oligonucleotide
- Apyrase
- Phosphate
- Adenosine diphosphate ribose
