= Max Bennett (scientist) =

Australian neuroscientist (born 1939)

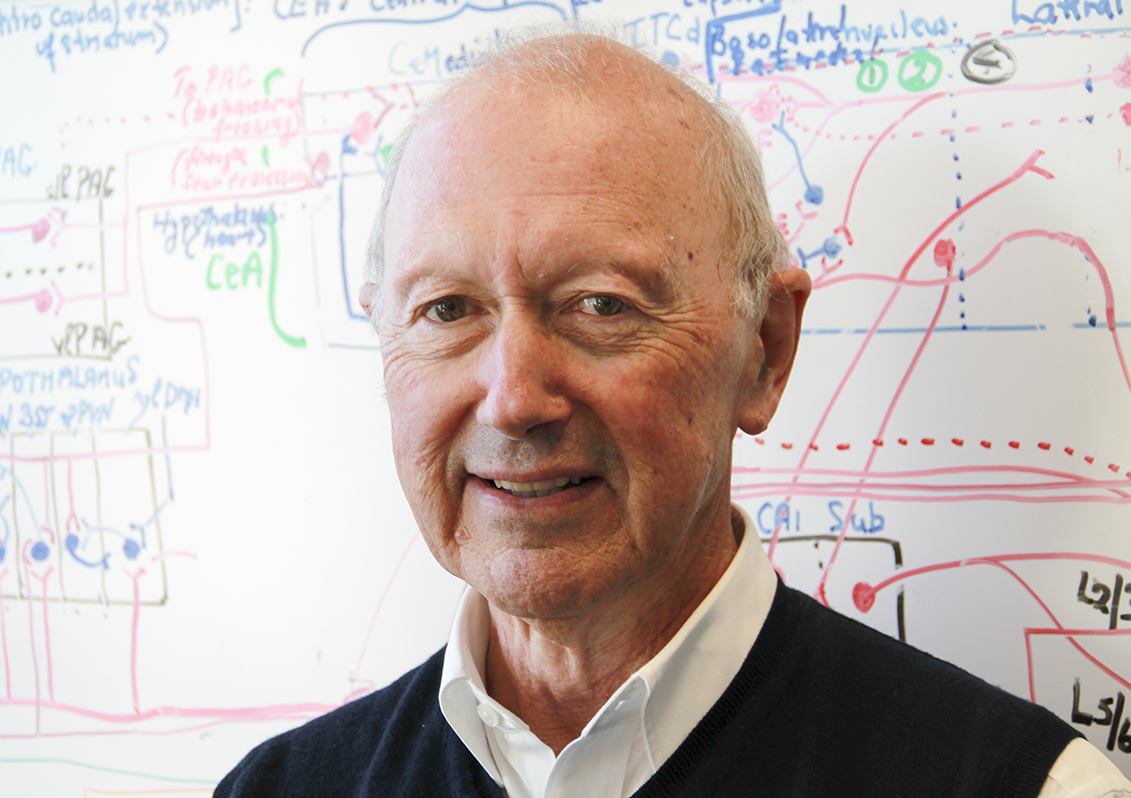
- Born: February 19, 1939 (age 87); Melbourne, Victoria, Australia
- Known for: Non-adrenergic, non-cholinergic transmission Synaptic transmission Synapse formation and regression Mereological fallacy

Academic background
- Influences: Charles Scott Sherrington, Bernard Katz, Ludwig Wittgenstein

Academic work
- Discipline: Neuroscience of synapses
- Main interests: Neuropsychiatry
- Notable ideas: The mereological fallacy in neuroscience and the philosophy of mind
- Website: http://www.maxrbennett.com

Maxwell Richard Bennett (born February 19, 1939) is an Australian neuroscientist and professor emeritus at the University of Sydney, specializing in the function of synapses. He discovered mechanisms of nerve transmission and synaptic function, and has studied plasticity and consciousness.

Bennett is a Fellow of the Australian Academy of Science and an Honorary Fellow of the Australian Neuroscience Society. He served as President of the Australian Neuroscience Society from 1990-1991. He is an Officer of the Order of Australia and has received a Centenary Medal from the Australian Government and the Macfarlane Burnet Medal from the Australian Academy of Science.

== Education ==
Max Bennett was born in Melbourne on February 19, 1939 to a Jewish father from Galatz, on the border between Russia and Romania, and a Catholic-Irish mother. Bennett was raised as Jewish by his father but enrolled as a student in Catholic schools by his mother, one of which was run by the Christian Brothers. Bennett's father served in Australia and New Guinea during the Second World War, and in later life read Eastern philosophy, adopting the lifestyle of a Buddhist monk. When Max was age 14, his father insisted that he leave school to work for the Post Master General’s Department. Bennett obeyed, but also went to night school. He was eventually able to earn a scholarship and to enter Melbourne University.

This diverse background, combined with a philosophical interest in how the human mind works, led Bennett to the study of neurophysiology. He did undergraduate work in electrical engineering and physics at the University of Melbourne. After Geoffrey Burnstock joined the Department of Zoology in October 1959, Bennett began working with him as a part-time assistant. In 1962 Bennett became Burnstock’s student. He received his Bachelor of Engineering (Electrical) in 1963 and went on to complete his MSc (1965) and PhD (1967) at the University of Melbourne. Bennett's interest in brain and mind led to his research in biology on synapses. Bennett also founded the Athenian Society, dedicated to understanding Plato, Aristotle and Wittgenstein.

== Career ==
In 1968 Bennett took up a position as lecturer in physiology at University of Sydney. In 1980 Malcolm Fraser proposed that the Australian Government make funding available for the establishment of new Research Centres of Excellence at Australian universities. As part of the ARC Centre of Excellence initiative, Bennett was appointed Director of a new Neurobiology Research Centre at Sydney (1982-1990). Bennett was appointed as a Professor of Physiology from 1983-2000 and was then awarded a Personal Chair at the University of Sydney. In 2003, he was appointed Professor of Neuroscience. He was noted "for research recognized internationally as of exceptional distinction". As of 2020, he became a Professor Emeritus of Neuroscience.

Bennett also chaired a national committee to assess the state of science in Australia. On 16 April 1985, Bennett led a national meeting of concern on science and technology, held in Canberra in response to cuts in Federal funding for science and criticisms of the then Minister for Science (Mr Barry Jones AC). It was organized by the National Committee for the Promotion of Science and Technology, which Bennett chaired, and sponsored by the Academy of Science. The meeting elected an Interim Committee which formed the Federation of Australian Scientific and Technological Societies (FASTS), later renamed Science & Technology Australia.

In 1994, Bennett played the leading role in founding the International Society for Autonomic Neuroscience (ISAN). The ISAN Interim Executive Committee was formed on 2 July 1994, at a meeting at the University of Melbourne, Australia, with Max Bennett as Executive Vice-President. ISAN was formally constituted in March 1995, with Geoff Burnstock elected as the Foundation President.

In 2003, Bennett was the driving force that resulted in the formation of the Brain and Mind Research Institute (BMRI) at the University of Sydney along with John D. Pollard and Ian Hickie. BMRI was a multidisciplinary research institute in neuroscience, neurology and psychiatry, with outpatients and the support of 18 research professors working in 15,000 square meters of new research space and clinical services. Bennett was appointed as the first Scientific Director of the BMRI, and the psychiatrist professor Ian Hickie was appointed as the first Executive Director. The center was renamed the Brain and Mind Centre (BMC) in 2015.

Bennett worked with John Mendoza and others over a period of years to organize the Queensland Mind and Neuroscience Institute Foundation, later renamed the Sunshine Coast Mind and Neuroscience - Thompson Institute. It was officially launched on May 2, 2018, with Bennett as the founding Chair of the Board. Bennett also served on the Board of Townsville's Tropical Brain and Mind Research Foundation (TBMRF).

== Neuroscience ==
In 1963, following his graduation in electrical engineering and the beginning of his postgraduate research in biology, Bennett published a paper with Geoffrey Burnstock, Graeme Campbell, and Mollie Holman. They reported the discovery that the accepted paradigm of nearly 50 years, that there are only two transmitters, noradrenaline and acetylcholine, was incorrect. This work showed that other transmitters, in addition to noradrenaline and acetylcholine, exist in the peripheral nervous system. These non-adrenergic and non-cholinergic (NANC) transmitters act on smooth muscle cells and generate action potentials due to the influx of calcium ions. In 1966, Bennett, Burnstock and Holman further showed that inhibitory chemical transmissions from parasympathetic nerves were unaffected by substances that blocked cholinergic and adrenergic junctions.

Bennett went on to show that calcium changes in a nerve terminal directly related to synaptic efficacy. In the succeeding years Bennett and his colleagues elucidated how NANC transmission, involving purines, neuropeptides and nitric oxide, is affected. Bennett's work demonstrated that action potentials can be due to the influx of calcium ions. In 1972 he discovered that lesioned nerve terminals are precisely reconstituted at the same site on a striated muscle cell, indicating the existence of synapse formation molecules on muscle cells, describing a paradigm for synapse formation during development and regeneration. In 2001 Bennett and colleagues showed that once a nerve terminal is established the glial ensheathing cells can guide the formation of new synapses on mature muscle cells in a matter of minutes. In 2007 he observed that microglial cells of the brain can conduct calcium waves that are mediated by the release of NANC transmitters. This work showed that microglial cells, the most dynamic cell in the brain, act as an interface between the neural and immune systems by propagating calcium waves using purines as transmitters, opening up the study of the interaction of the immune and nervous systems at the level of the synapse.

== History and philosophy of neuroscience ==
The main theme of Bennett's philosophical work is that brain scientists have misused language in attributing our psychological capacities as in thinking, remembering, perceiving etc. to the brain. Rather it is the person whose brain it is that possesses these attributes, the brain being necessary for us to express these abilities. This mistake in confusing parts for wholes is referred to as the "mereological fallacy" by Bennett and his colleague Peter Hacker. Clarifying these misunderstandings has profound implications for how we view ourselves.

In his historical work Bennett has followed the evolution of our ideas concerning the functioning of the different components of the brain and their organization from the time of Aristotle to the present. He argues that fundamental ideas arise in this area through a combination of research, prejudice and irrationality and of how appropriate hypotheses concerning brain function are often abandoned for extended periods of time in favour of less logical hypotheses. Such an hypothesis is one in which it is posited that brain function can be considered in isolation from the behaviour of the human whose brain it is, whereas behaviour (broadly conceived) is the bedrock upon which all studies of human attributes rests, neuroscientific or otherwise.

Bennett's books concerning these issues include The Idea of Consciousness (1997), History of the Synapse (2000), Philosophical Foundations of Neuroscience (2003; with Peter Hacker) and Neuroscience and Philosophy: Brain, Mind and Language (with Daniel Dennett, John Searle and Peter Hacker; 2006). More recently he elaborated on the theme that much of neuroscience repeatedly makes the mistake of not only attributing to the brain psychological capacities that can only be attributed to the person whose brain it is, but also attributing these capacities to parts of the brain, a "modular fallacy". Furthermore, Bennett argues that cognitive neuroscience "represents" these capacities as interconnected boxes leading to reification of the person with these capacities. These difficulties are spelt out in his books Virginia Woolf and Neuropsychiatry (2013) as well as in History of Cognitive Neuroscience (2008; with Peter Hacker).

== Neuropsychiatry ==
In 2009 Bennett and his colleagues examined functioning of synapses in neuropsychiatric diseases and showed that stress could lead to the loss of synapses in certain parts of the brain, which might result in the loss of grey matter. Such a loss can be observed, using Magnetic Resonance Imaging (MRI), in some patients who suffered from stress. Those results helped to define the cellular basis of grey matter changes, determined by MRI. His preliminary calculations then provided the first quantitative account of how synaptic activity in the brain, driving impulse activity, is responsible for utilizing most of the cortical energy, showing that the energy required to maintain a synapse-initiated impulse in a neuron remains the same over different behavioural states and species. This work was followed by a quantitative account of how the loss of nerve pathway integrity in the brain in schizophrenia leads to dysfunction of synapses in the grey matter and hence a decrease in cortical energy. This indicated that changes in the energy expended in particular areas of the brain, and therefore impulse activity there, can be quantitatively explained as due to changes in the integrity of axons joining these areas. Further work suggests that white matter microstructure may be a sensitive measure of age- and disease-related changes that affect cognition. Alterations in microstructure may precede alterations in macrostructure that are characteristic of aging and neurodegeneration.

== Awards and lectures ==
Bennett was appointed an Officer of the Order of Australia in the 2001 Queen's Birthday Honours, 'for his service to the biological sciences, particularly in the field of neuroscience and as a major contributor to the establishment of organisations aimed at furthering interdisciplinary research in this field, and to education'. In addition, Bennett has received the following recognition:

- 1981, Fellow of the Australian Academy of Science
- 1996, Goddard Research Award, Australian National Heart Foundation
- 1996, Ramaciotti Medal, Clive and Vera Ramaciotti Foundation
- 1998, Renensson Research Award, Australian National Heart Foundation
- 1999, Macfarlane Burnet Medal and Lecture, Australian Academy of Science
- 1999, Malcolm Research Award, Australian National Heart Foundation
- 2000, Centenary Medal (31 December 2000), Australian Government
- 2001, Distinguished Achievement Medal, Australian Neuroscience Society
- 2001, Excellence in Science (Tall Poppy) Award, Australian Institute of Political Science
- 2001, Almgren Research Award, Australian National Heart Foundation
- 2002, Orator, Academia Ophthalmologica Internationalis (AOI)
- 2009, Honorary Fellow, Australian Neuroscience Society
- 2010, Australasian Neuroscience Society Medallion, Australian Neuroscience Society

In 1996 Bennett gave the Opening Plenary Lecture at the World Congress of Neuroscience (Tokyo). This was succeeded by distinguished lectures in neuroscience, neuropsychiatry as well as in the history and philosophy of neuroscience as follows:

- 2001, Plenary Lecture, International Conference, Research Society on Alcoholism
- 2002, Featured Speaker, XIV World Congress of Cardiology
- 2002, Academia Ophthalmologica Internationalis Oration
- 2005, Plenary Lecture, American Philosophical Association
- 2006, Plenary Lecture, International Congress of Neuropsychiatry
- 2007, Plenary Lecture, The Royal Australian & New Zealand College of Psychiatrists
- 2008, Plenary Lecture, World Congress in Medical Informatics
- 2008, Plenary Lecture, International Congress in Nanotechnology
- 2009, Plenary Lecture, World Congress of Mental Health Nurses
- 2009, Grass Lecture, Indian National Institute of Mental Health & Neuroscience
- 2009, Nour Foundation Lecture (at the United Nations, NY)
- 2013, Franke Lectures, (Yale University)

== Selected works ==
=== Articles ===
- Burnstock, G; Campbell, G; Bennett, M; Holman, ME (9 November 1963). "Inhibition of the Smooth Muscle of the Taenia Coli". Nature. 200 (4906): 581–2. Bibcode:1963Natur.200..581B. doi:10.1038/200581a0. PMID 14082235.
- Bennett, MR; Burnstock, G; Holman, M (February 1966). "Transmission from intramural inhibitory nerves to the smooth muscle of the guinea-pig taenia coli". The Journal of Physiology. 182 (3): 541–58. doi:10.1113/jphysiol.1966.sp007836. PMC 1357486. PMID 5943000.
- Bennett, MR (June 1967). "The effect of cations on the electrical properties of the smooth muscle cells of the guinea-pig vas deferens". The Journal of Physiology. 190 (3): 465–79. doi:10.1113/jphysiol.1967.sp008222. PMC 1365422. PMID 6051782.
- Bennett, MR; Pettigrew, AG (1976). "The formation of neuromuscular synapses". Cold Spring Harbor Symposia on Quantitative Biology. 40: 409–24. doi:10.1101/sqb.1976.040.01.039. PMID 1065534.
- Brain, KL; Bennett, MR (1 August 1997). "Calcium in sympathetic varicosities of mouse vas deferens during facilitation, augmentation and autoinhibition". The Journal of Physiology. 502 (Pt 3): 521–36. doi:10.1111/j.1469-7793.1997.521bj.x. PMC 1159525. PMID 9279805.
- Hansen, MA; Balcar, VJ; Barden, JA; Bennett, MR (1998). "The distribution of single P2x1-receptor clusters on smooth muscle cells in relation to nerve varicosities in the rat urinary bladder". Journal of Neurocytology. 27 (7): 529–39. doi:10.1023/a:1006908010642. PMID 11246492.
- Bennett, MR; Farnell, L; Gibson, WG (May 2000). "The probability of quantal secretion within an array of calcium channels of an active zone". Biophysical Journal. 78 (5): 2222–40. Bibcode:2000BpJ....78.2222B. doi:10.1016/S0006-3495(00)76770-1. PMC 1300815. PMID 10777722.
- Dutton, JL; Poronnik, P; Li, GH; Holding, CA; Worthington, RA; Vandenberg, RJ; Cook, DI; Barden, JA; Bennett, MR (23 August 2000). "P2X(1) receptor membrane redistribution and down-regulation visualized by using receptor-coupled green fluorescent protein chimeras". Neuropharmacology. 39 (11): 2054–66. doi:10.1016/s0028-3908(00)00058-7. PMID 10963749.
- Macleod, GT; Dickens, PA; Bennett, MR (1 April 2001). "Formation and function of synapses with respect to Schwann cells at the end of motor nerve terminal branches on mature amphibian (Bufo marinus) muscle". The Journal of Neuroscience. 21 (7): 2380–92. doi:10.1523/JNEUROSCI.21-07-02380.2001. PMC 6762398. PMID 11264312.
- Bennett, MR; Hacker, PM (December 2001). "Perception and memory in neuroscience: a conceptual analysis". Progress in Neurobiology. 65 (6): 499–543. doi:10.1016/s0301-0082(01)00020-x. PMID 11728643.
- Bennett, MR; Hacker, PM (May 2002). "The motor system in neuroscience: a history and analysis of conceptual developments". Progress in Neurobiology. 67 (1): 1–52. doi:10.1016/s0301-0082(02)00012-6. PMID 12126655.
- Bennett, MR; Buljan, V; Farnell, L; Gibson, WG (March 2008). "Purinergic junctional transmission and propagation of calcium waves in cultured spinal cord microglial networks". Purinergic Signalling. 4 (1): 47–59. doi:10.1007/s11302-007-9076-9. PMC 2246000. PMID 18368533.
- Bennett, MR (April 2009). "Criminal law as it pertains to 'mentally incompetent defendants': a McNaughton rule in the light of cognitive neuroscience". The Australian and New Zealand Journal of Psychiatry. 43 (4): 289–99. doi:10.1080/00048670902721137. PMID 19296283.
- Bennett, MR (November 2011). "Schizophrenia: susceptibility genes, dendritic-spine pathology and gray matter loss". Progress in Neurobiology. 95 (3): 275–300. doi:10.1016/j.pneurobio.2011.08.003. PMID 21907759.
- Hyder, F; Rothman, DL; Bennett, MR (26 February 2013). "Cortical energy demands of signaling and nonsignaling components in brain are conserved across mammalian species and activity levels". Proceedings of the National Academy of Sciences of the United States of America. 110 (9): 3549–54. Bibcode:2013PNAS..110.3549H. doi:10.1073/pnas.1214912110. PMC 3587194. PMID 23319606.
- Kassem, MS; Lagopoulos, J; Stait-Gardner, T; Price, WS; Chohan, TW; Arnold, JC; Hatton, SN; Bennett, MR (April 2013). "Stress-induced grey matter loss determined by MRI is primarily due to loss of dendrites and their synapses". Molecular Neurobiology. 47 (2): 645–61. doi:10.1007/s12035-012-8365-7. PMID 23138690.
- Bennett, MR; Farnell, L; Gibson, WG (2013). "Fiber pathway pathology, synapse loss and decline of cortical function in schizophrenia". PLOS ONE. 8 (4) e60518. Bibcode:2013PLoSO...860518B. doi:10.1371/journal.pone.0060518. PMC 3620229. PMID 23593232.
- O'Doherty, DC; Chitty, KM; Saddiqui, S; Bennett, MR; Lagopoulos, J (30 April 2015). "A systematic review and meta-analysis of magnetic resonance imaging measurement of structural volumes in posttraumatic stress disorder". Psychiatry Research. 232 (1): 1–33. doi:10.1016/j.pscychresns.2015.01.002. PMID 25735885.
- Bennett, MR; Hatton, S; Hermens, DF; Lagopoulos, J (October 2016). "Behavior, neuropsychology and fMRI". Progress in Neurobiology. 145–146: 1–25. doi:10.1016/j.pneurobio.2016.07.001. PMID 27393370.

=== Books ===
Bennett's books have been translated into several languages.

- Bennett, M. R. (1972). Autonomic neuromuscular transmission. Cambridge [Eng.]: Cambridge University Press. ISBN 0521084636.
- Bennett, M.R. (1987). Optimising research and development in Australia. Canberra: Australian Academy of Science. ISBN 0858471388.
- Bennett, M. R. (1997). The idea of consciousness: synapses and the mind. Amsterdam: Harwood Academic Publ. ISBN 9057022036.
- Bennett, M. R. (2001). History of the synapse. Australia Canada France [etc.]: Harwood academic publ. ISBN 9058231321.
- Bennett, M. R.; Hacker, Peter (2003). Philosophical foundations of neuroscience. Oxford: Blackwell. ISBN 140510855X.
- Bennett, M. R.; Dennett, Daniel; Hacker, Peter; Searle, John (2007). Neuroscience and philosophy: brain, mind and language. New York: Columbia University Press. ISBN 9780231140447.
- Bennett, M. R.; Hacker, Peter (2008). History of cognitive neuroscience. Chichester: Wiley-Blackwell. ISBN 978-1405181822.
- Bennett, M. R. (2013). Virginia Woolf and neuropsychiatry. Dordrecht: Springer. ISBN 9789400757486.
- Bennett, M. R. (2019). The search for knowledge and understanding. University Of Sydney, NSW: Sydney University Press. ISBN 9781742104492.
- Bennett, M. R. (2022). The search for truth: History and future of universities. NSW, Australia: The University of Sydney. ISBN 9781742105208.
- Bennett, Maxwell R. (2024). Childhood Stress, Trauma and Synapse Loss (1st ed.). Singapore: Springer. ISBN 9789819728039.

== Interviews ==
- Bennett, Max; Blythe, Max (1996). "Professor Max Bennett FAA in interview with Dr Max Blythe". OpenEQUELLA. Oxford Brookes University. doi:10.24384/000147.
