= 2005 Australia Day Honours =

The 2005 Australia Day Honours are appointments to various orders and honours to recognise and reward good works by Australian citizens. The list was announced on 26 January 2005 by the Governor General of Australia, Michael Jeffrey.

The Australia Day Honours are the first of the two major annual honours lists, the first announced to coincide with Australia Day (26 January), with the other being the Queen's Birthday Honours, which are announced on the second Monday in June.

== Order of Australia ==
=== Companion (AC) ===
==== General Division ====
| Recipient | Citation | Notes |
|---|---|---|
| Dr Jean Elizabeth Calder | For humanitarian service in the Middle East, particularly to people with disabilities living in refugee camps in Lebanon and Gaza and disadvantaged areas of Cairo, to international relations, and to academic and professional training in the fields of education and rehabilitation. | |
| Emeritus Professor Enid Mona Campbell OBE | For service to the legal scholarship and education, to raising debate in the field of constitutional law and to public law reform. | |
| Professor Derek Ashworth Denton | For service to science through leadership in medical research in the field of physiology relating to sodium homeostasis and the body's regulation of fluid and electrolyte balances and to the arts. | |
| Lady (Mary) Fairfax AM OBE | For service to the community of wide-ranging social and economic benefit through support and philanthropy for ongoing medical research initiatives, improved health care opportunities, nurturing artistic talent in young performers, and preservation of diverse cultural heritage. | |
| The Honourable Timothy Andrew Fischer | For service to the Australian and New South Wales Parliaments, to advancing the national interest through trade liberalisation and rail transport development, to supporting humanitarian aid in developing countries and to fostering openness and acceptance of cultural difference in the community. | |
| The Honourable Jeffrey Gibb Kennett | For service to the Victorian Parliament and the introduction of initiatives for economic and social benefit, to business and commerce, and to the community in the development of the arts, sport and mental health awareness strategies. | |
| Mark Matthew Leibler AO | For services to business, to the law, particularly in the areas of taxation and commercial law, to the Jewish community internationally and in Australia, and to reconciliation and the promotion of understanding between Indigenous and non-Indigenous Australians. | |

=== Officer (AO) ===
==== General Division ====
| Recipient | Citation | Notes |
|---|---|---|
| Professor Michael Philip Alpers | For service to medical science as a leading international research in the fields of tropical medicine and public health, including research on the disease Kuru, and for contributions to improving health and economic development in Papua New Guinea. | |
| The Honourable Justice Bryan Alan Beaumont | For service to the judiciary, to the administration of the court, to improving legal education facilities and judicial infrastructure in the Pacific region, and to the community. | |
| The Honourable Justice Annabelle Claire Bennett | For service to the law, particularly in the areas of intellectual property, administrative law and professional conduct, and to the community through a range of educational, medical, women's and business organisations. | |
| Margaret Sneddon Bickle | For service to the pharmaceutical profession as an advocate and mentor for women in the profession, and to the community. | |
| Martin Bonsey CVO | For distinguished service and principled contributions to public sector reform, to government and parliamentary issues and to the Office of the Official Secretary to the Governor-General. | |
| Clinical Associate Professor Harvey Charles Coates | For service to medicine in the field of paediatric otolaryngology as a clinician and researcher, to Indigenous health, and to the community through contributions to major medical research and educational organisations. | |
| The Honourable Terence Rhoderic Cole RFD QC | For service to the judiciary, particularly judicial administration, to reform of the building and construction industry, and to the community through the Australian Naval Reserve and conservation and arts organisations. | |
| Lynton Keith Crosby | For service to politics as Federal Director of the Liberal Party of Australia. | |
| Professor Ivan Stanley de la Lande † | For service to medical research and education, particularly in the field of pharmacology and as a major contributor to understanding of the human vascular system. | |
| Professor Terence Dwyer AM | For service to medical research as an epidemiologist, particularly in the areas of cardiovascular disease and sudden infant death syndrome, and to the community. | |
| Leonard Raymond Foster | For service to fire and emergency services management, particularly through the development of best practice and a coordinated approach to fire control in Australia. | |
| Dr Sandra Michelle Hacker | For service to medicine, particularly in the field of psychiatry, and to excellence in professional education and promotion of the highest standards of health care in Australia. | |
| Robert Watson Hughes MBE | For service to the arts through music, particularly as a composer, and for the promotion of Australian music through representative organisations for musicians. | |
| Dr Harold Neil Johnston | For service to the community through the initiation and implementation of a range of policies designed to meet the diverse welfare and social needs of ex-Service personnel and their families, and more broadly to public sector administration in the areas of economic and business development and service delivery. | |
| Steve Arthur Karas OAM | For service to the community as a contributor to the development of multicultural media and to migrant assistance organisations in Australia, and through public sector roles, particularly in the portfolio area of immigration. | |
| Christine McNamee Liddy | For service to the community, particularly through fundraising and promoting awareness of the role of the Royal Flying Doctor Service of Australia and for support for a range of educational and arts organisations. | |
| Malcolm James McCusker QC | For service to the legal profession, particularly in the fields of criminal and commercial law, to the business and finance sectors, and to the community through a range of health, church, cultural and sporting organisations. | |
| Dr Giancarlo Martini-Piovano | For service to the community as Director of Co.As.It through the promotion of improved health and community services for culturally and linguistically diverse communities. | |
| Ken Harry Matthews | For service to the community through the development of more competitive and sustainable regional industries and service, to the national transport system, and to promoting the highest standards of public administration. | |
| The Honourable Roderick Pitt Meagher QC | For service to the judiciary, to legal scholarship and professional development, and to the arts. | |
| Professor Nicos Anthony Nicola | For service to scientific research and to policy development within the field of cellular and molecular biochemistry, and to the development of medical biotechnology in Australia. | |
| Elizabeth Ann Nosworthy | For service to business through contributions to major development, energy and infrastructure projects, to the legal profession, particularly in the area of legal education, and to the community. | |
| Dr Barry William Perry | For service to the community as Ombudsman of Victoria through encouraging the highest standards of integrity and accountability in public institutions. | |
| Daniel Petre | For service to business, particularly in information technology, and to the community through philanthropic support for medical research, promotion of work/life balance and educational organisations. | |
| Professor John David Pollard | For service to medicine in the field of neurology, particularly the study of peripheral nerve disease and multiple sclerosis. | |
| The Honourable Justice Simon Sheller | For service to the law, particularly in the field of judicial administration, and to the community through the Anglican Church of Australia. | |
| Frederic Sydney Stolle | For service to tennis as a player, coach and media commentator, and to promoting Australian sport and culture internationally. | |
| Associate Professor Alison May Street | For service to medicine, particularly in the field of haematology, and as a significant contributor to the management of congenital bleeding disorders and minimisation of transfusion transmitted infection. | |
| Professor Sharon Mary Sullivan | For service to cultural heritage conservation, including Indigenous heritage, and to influencing conservation practices worldwide. | |
| Dr Walter Wilhelm Uhlenbruch AM | For service to business and commerce, particularly the automotive manufacturing sector through a range of executive positions, to the promotion of Australian industry internationally, and to the German community. | |
| Margaret Louise Varady | For leadership in education, particularly as Principal of Sydney Girls High School, to fostering academic excellence and to promoting student participation across a range of community activities, sports and the arts. | |
| Joan Agnes Vickery | For service to the Indigenous community as a leader in the development of culturally sensitive health care initiatives, particularly in the area of diabetes treatment and management. | |

==== Military Division ====
| Branch | Recipient | Citation | Notes |
|---|---|---|---|
| Navy | Rear Admiral Raydon William Gates CSM | For distinguished service as the inaugural Commander of the Australian Defence College and as Maritime Commander Australia. | |
| Army | Major General Gregory Howard Garde AM RFD QC | For distinguished service to the Australian Defence Force Reserves, in particular as the Assistant Chief of the Defence Force (Reserves) and Head Reserve Policy. | |
| Army | Major General Duncan Edward Lewis DSC CSC | For distinguished service and performance of duty as Commander Special Forces and subsequently as the inaugural Special Operations Commander Australia. | |
| Air Force | Air Vice-Marshal Kerry Francis Clarke AM | For distinguished service in the fields of international relationships and capability management and development. | |

=== Member (AM) ===
==== General Division ====
| Recipient | Citation | Notes |
|---|---|---|
| Brian John Acworth | For service to the community, particularly through the Juvenile Diabetes Research Foundation, social welfare and health organisations, and to business development. | |
| Kenneth Craig Allen | For service to the business and finance sectors, to international relations as Consul-General in New York, and to the community through fundraising for charitable organisations. | |
| Professor Warwick Peter Anderson | For service to health and medical research through leadership roles with the National Health and Medical Research Council, to the development of medical science at Monash University, and to hypertension and renal physiology research. | |
| Margaret Mavis Baker | For service to hockey through administration, policy development and umpiring roles, particularly in South Australia. | |
| Geoffrey Stirling Ballard | For service to off-road motorcycle racing as the winner of eight national and eleven international Six Day Enduro Championships, and through promotion of the sport. | |
| Barbara Ann Barraclough | For service to education, particularly as Principal of Bankstown Girls’ High School, to support for innovative vocational and training programs, and to the wider Bankstown community. | |
| Councillor Paul Vincent Bell | For service to local government, particularly through the Queensland and Australian Local Government Associations, to regional development and tourism, to vocational education and training, and to the community. | |
| The Reverend Dr Geoffrey Cyril Bingham MM | For service to the community through Christian ministry, encouraging cross-cultural theological education and as an author. | |
| Thomas Harold Bisset | For service to the development of the community housing sector to meet the needs of low income and disadvantaged residents, and as a major contributor to debate on broader social welfare and policy issues. | |
| Damian John Bugg QC | For service to the law, particularly in the role of Director of Public Prosecutions at state and federal levels, and through the encouragement of international co-operation in the area of criminal law and practice. | |
| The Honourable Justice Rodney Keith Burr | For service to the law in Australia and internationally, particularly through the establishment of the World Congress on Family Law and the Rights of Children and Youth. | |
| Associate Professor Victor Ian Callanan | For service to medicine through the improvement and expansion of medical services in north Queensland, particularly in the fields of anaesthesia, intensive care, pain management and hyperbaric medicine, and to surf lifesaving. | |
| Gary Thomas Campbell | For service to primary industry through the Royal Agricultural and Horticultural Society of South Australia, and to the community. | |
| Dr Andrew James Cannon | For service to judicial administration, particularly through reform of civil litigation processes, and to the community through the Falie project and a range of charitable organisations. | |
| Louis Aron Challis | For service to engineering as a pioneer in environmental and architectural acoustic engineering, particularly the development of noise standards, acoustic planning and design of landmark buildings, and advancements in environmental noise testing. | |
| The Honourable Bruce Anthony Chamberlain | For service to the Victorian Parliament, particularly by fostering the democratic process, to improved library and information technology services, to promoting public interest in the Parliament, and to the community. | |
| Associate Professor George Chin-Huat Cho | For service to education, particularly in the study and application of Geographic Information Systems and the law, and to the Institute of Australian Geographers. | |
| The Reverend Robert Kable Clark | For service to the Baptist Churches of Western Australia through the establishment of education programs for theological students. | |
| Narelle Clay | For service to the community, particularly through social justice advocacy and the provision of accommodation and support services for homeless young people. | |
| Ian Stanley Collins | For service to sport, particularly Australian Rules football through administrative roles and the establishment and development of trainee programs. | |
| Professor William Barry Coman | For service to medicine in the fields of otolaryngology and head and neck surgery and through professional organisations. | |
| Susan Hewison Conde | For service to the community through organisations and advisory bodies that promote the interests of women, to youth through the Guiding movement, and to the Uniting Church in Australia. | |
| Lesley Jennifer Conn | For service to the community through administrative and fundraising roles in support of a range of health and welfare organisations. | |
| Dr Aileen Forsyth Connon | For service to public health and medicine, particularly through organisations to improve available health care for women and children, and to medical education. | |
| Aleathea Joan Cooper | For service to the community of Katoomba through a range of organisations including the Blue Mountains People for Reconciliation. | |
| Harvey Leslie Cooper | For service to the judiciary and to judicial education, and to the community through offender rehabilitation programs. | |
| Professor Stephen Moile Cordner | For service to forensic medicine, particularly as a contributor to the development of forensic pathology in Australia and internationally. | |
| Professor John de Jersey | For service to science education, to research in the field of enzyme biochemistry and molecular biology, and to academia. | |
| Lynette Josephine Denny | For service to the performing arts through administrative roles with state and regional arts organisations, as a teacher of dance, and as a choreographer. | |
| Peter Alan Dexter | For service to the development of the shipping and maritime industries through leadership roles, to international relations, and to the community. | |
| Malcolm Douglas Donnelly | For service to the performing arts as an operatic baritone and to the education and mentoring of young singers. | |
| Nicola Rosemary Downer | For service to the arts, particularly regional arts programs as a board member of a range of organisations, and to the community. | |
| Graham Allan Downie | For service to the community, particularly youth through the Scouting movement, and to journalism. | |
| Emeritus Professor Harold Raymond Edwards | For service to the community, particularly through overseas development aid projects and Opportunity International Australia, to the Australian Parliament, and to education in the field of economics. | |
| John Richard Elder | For service to industrial relations within the building and construction industry in New South Wales, particularly as an advocate for appropriate safety measures and employee training, rehabilitation and compensation. | |
| Peter Sydney Fardoulys | For service to the building and construction sector through industry association roles in Queensland and nationally, and to the community through arts, medical, children's and church organisations. | |
| Dr John Stanley Flett | For service to the community through fundraising for charitable organisations, and executive roles with St John Ambulance and a range of organisations in the Yorke Peninsula area. | |
| Noala Therese Flynn | For service to the community, particularly through the development and implementation of palliative care services in the western region of Melbourne. | |
| Sister Pauline Anne Flynn | For service to the community through social welfare programs and pastoral care services for people who are homeless or vulnerable. | |
| Professor Gordon William Ford | For service to industrial relations, particularly through the development of the theory and practice of workplace reform, to the establishment of industrial relations as a field of study in Australia, and as a contributor to community organisations. | |
| John Curlewis Forsyth | For service to aviation as an adviser to Government and as a leader in the development and automation of air traffic systems in Australia. | |
| Stuart Grant Fowler | For service to the law in Australia and internationally, particularly through the establishment of the World Congress on Family Law and the Rights of Children and Youth. | |
| Denis Stanley Gibbons | For service to the recording and preservation of the history of Australia's involvement in the Vietnam War as a correspondent and photographer, and to organisations that preserve military records and memorabilia. | |
| Dr Moira Therese Gordon | For service to economic and social development in the Hunter region, particularly as a contributor to decision making processes of the boards of community organisations, and to tertiary education. | |
| Gwenyth Alison Graham | For service to the community, particularly Indigenous people, refugees and asylum seekers through a range of church and welfare organisations in Western Australia. | |
| Emeritus Professor Glenice Kay Hancock | For service to educational administration through leadership and management roles in the tertiary and public school sectors. | |
| Denis Anthony Handlin | For service to the music industry, particularly through the promotion of Australian musicians, to professional organisations, and to the community through fundraising for charitable organisations. | |
| Dr Douglas John Harbison | For service to medicine and to the community through the provision of consultant physician services in the Tamworth region, particularly in the areas of diabetes and cardio-respiratory care, and to Lions International. | |
| Graham James Hart | For service to business and finance, and to the community through organisations related to medical research, the arts, education and agriculture and industry. | |
| William Hauritz | For service to the community, particularly through the establishment of the Woodford Folk Festival and leadership roles in organisations that provide a forum for the promotion of cross-cultural and artistic awareness. | |
| Dr Dick Peter Henry † | For service to veterinary science through the development of disease-free piggeries and environmentally sound waste management practices, and the breeding of pathogen-free livestock. | |
| Dr John Melville Holder | For service to veterinary science and to the pig industry through research and the establishment of large-scale intensive potteries, and as a contributor to industry and professional organisations. | |
| Alan John Hopgood | For service to the performing arts as an actor, playwright and producer, and to the community through raising awareness of men's health issues. | |
| Catriona Suzy Hughes | For service to the development of the Australian film and television industry through influencing policy formulation, supporting and giving expression to artistic talent and providing sound business and investment guidance. | |
| Charles Edward Hulley | For service to the community, particularly health care as Chairman of the Paul and Elizabeth Curran Foundation at St Vincent's Hospital, Sydney, to encouraging multiculturalism, and to greater understanding of Indigenous culture. | |
| Anthony Kyle Irvine | For service to conservation and the environment, particularly rainforest ecology, and to the recording and preserving of Indigenous knowledge of flora and fauna. | |
| Professor Garry Lawrence Jennings | For service to medicine in the areas of cardiothoracic research and public health, to the Baker Heart Research Institute and The Alfred Hospital, and to professional and health-related organisations. | |
| Kenneth Athol Jolly | For service to the promotion of children's literature and to the community through philanthropic support for organisations benefiting sick and underprivileged children. | |
| Professor Douglas Edgar Joshua | For service to medicine, particularly in the field of haematology and in multiple myeloma research, to postgraduate education, and to professional organisations. | |
| Badra Kamal Karunarathna | For service to multicultural broadcasting and to the community through Sri Lankan cultural organisations, support for women, and social welfare groups. | |
| John Fouhy Kearney QC | For service to the community as an adviser and benefactor to education and church organisations, and through the preservation of a number of architecturally significant buildings in the City of Melbourne. | |
| Professor Robert Edward Kearney | For service to the sustainable management of fisheries resources and to the development of national and international research programs and policies. | |
| Professor John Philip Keeves | For service to educational research, particularly the development of statistical methods for measuring and analysing educational outcomes and to professional organisations and mentoring of research associates and students. | |
| Mostyn Godfrey Keller | For service to the Indigenous community through the Finke River Mission, the development of language and literacy programs for the preservation of culture, and through skill development programs and the creation of employment opportunities. | |
| William Ambrose Kelly | For service to education and to international relations, particularly through promoting the idea of service to others through projects involving secondary school students travelling to Africa to participate in community building projects in the Kalahari Desert. | |
| Dr John Stanley Keniry | For service to industry and to applied science in agricultural and environmental settings through promoting research and development for improved social and economic outcomes and to youth. | |
| Kevin Francis Kenneally | For service to the community through a range of organisations promoting environmental education, advancement of botanical knowledge, and interest of youth in natural history. | |
| Dr Antony David Kidman | For service to health, particularly research into the psycho-social impact of diseases including breast cancer and as a clinical psychologist. | |
| Robyn Caroline Kruk | For service to public administration in New South Wales, particularly in the areas of executive functions of government, commonwealth/state relations and in the strategic management of health services, natural resources and the environment. | |
| Peter John Laver | For service to industry, to tertiary education and training, and to science and technology. | |
| Judith Esther Leeson | For service to the community, particularly through support of people seeking opportunity for lifelong learning and career development. | |
| Dr Helen Olga Light | For service to the community as Director of the Jewish Museum of Australia, particularly through support for significant cultural exhibitions and community based programs. | |
| William Robert McComas | For service to business and commerce in the field of competition and corporate law through the Trade Practices Commission. | |
| Dr William Taylor McCoy | For service to health administration in South Australia through public sector and community organisations and to people with psychiatric illnesses. | |
| Geoffrey Ellison McIntyre | For service to business and finance through the banking sector, to the promotion of international relations, and to the community. | |
| Richard Joseph McKay | For service to business and finance, to the building and construction industry, and to the community. | |
| Max Kevin McKenna | For service to horticulture through the potato industry and leadership in research and development. | |
| Natalie June McNamara | For service to Catholic education through leadership in Human Resources. | |
| Patricia Marrfurra McTaggart | For service to the Indigenous community, particularly the Ngengkurrungkurr, Ngengiwumirri and Malak Malak traditional land owners through the preservation and documentation of traditional language in dictionaries and thesauruses, and to the compilation of books on flora and fauna. | |
| Ian Gower Mackley | For service to the development and promotion of Australia's wine industry, particularly through the Winemakers Federation of Australia and the Australian Wine and Brandy Corporation. | |
| Professor Errol John Maguire RFD | For service to medicine as a surgeon, educator and administrator, and to the Army Reserve. | |
| Professor Leslie Ronald Marchant † | For service to academic through research and scholarship in the fields of Chinese, Australia, and Aboriginal history and culture. | |
| The Honourable Kenneth Henry Marks QC | For service to the judiciary and to the law, particularly in the area of law reform and through the implementation of innovative changes to court administration. | |
| The Reverend Brother Francis Daniel Marzorini | For service to education, particularly in Christian Brothers’ schools, to English as a second language teacher and to the Australian Cadet Corps. | |
| John Meahan | For service to the community as National President of the St Vincent de Paul Society and through the development of collaborative programs with other social service agencies. | |
| Henry David Mendelson | For service to the community through a range of organisations including the Guide Dog Association of Australia, the Australian Council of Christians and Jews, the Jewish National Fund of Australia, and the Salvation Army. | |
| Keith Ross Miller | For service to sport, particularly cricket as a player, journalist and commentator. | |
| Russell Victor Miller | For service to the legal profession in the fields of international and business law and to the community through participation in a range of organisations related to aviation, rail transport and energy. | |
| Denis David Molyneux | For service to people with a disability through the development of sport and recreation opportunities. | |
| Nicholas Moraitis | For service to the community through support for a range of organisations related to the health and welfare of children, and to business through the fresh produce industry. | |
| Professor John G L Morris | For service to neurology and neurological education, particularly Parkinsons disease and movement disorders. | |
| Rupert Hordern Myer | For service to the arts, to support for museums and galleries, and to the community through a range of philanthropic and service organisations. | |
| Garry Barr Nehl | For service to the Australian Parliament and to the community through a range of organisations. | |
| Dr Henry Simpson Newland | For service to medicine in the field of ophthalmology, particularly in relation to Indigenous health and to reduction of eye disease in developing countries. | |
| Dr Peter Ronald Noblet | For service to dentistry as an administrator and educator, and to the community. | |
| Peter John North | For service to engineering and to business through the Warren Centre for Advanced Engineering and as a contributor to the advancement of innovative technology in manufacturing and other industries. | |
| The Honourable Justice Margaret Jean Nyland | For service to the judiciary, to human rights and the equal status of women, and to the community through a range of cultural organisations. | |
| Professor Christopher John O'Brien | For service to medicine, particularly to the specialty of head and neck surgery through leadership as a clinical researcher and teacher. | |
| Henry David O'Connor | For service to the community through a range of charitable and welfare organisations. | |
| Professor Margaret Mary O'Connor | For service to the development and establishment of palliative care services in Victoria. | |
| Associate Professor Justin O'Day | For service to medicine in the field of ophthalmology as a surgeon, clinician and teacher, to professional associations, and to the community. | |
| Barry John Palmer | For service to the community through Lions Australia, particularly through fundraising for childhood cancer research and for children with physical disabilities. | |
| The Honourable Warwick Raymond Parer | For service to the Australian Parliament, particularly through policy development and broadening of export opportunities for the mining industry, to energy market reform and to education. | |
| Peggy Pamela Parkin | For service to the community, particularly people with disabilities, and to local government in the City of Belmont. | |
| Florence Lucinda Pens | For service to the community through a range of support and service organisations, and to local government in the City of Charles Sturt. | |
| Professor Garry David Phillips | For service to medicine, particularly in the areas of anaesthesia, intensive care and emergency care, and to medical education. | |
| Margaret Anne Pomeranz | For service to the film industry as a critic and reviewer, promoter of Australian content, and advocate for freedom of expression in film. | |
| Ian John Purcell | For service to the community, particularly gay and lesbian people through advocacy, education, law reform and support for community events. | |
| Michael Anthony Reed | For service to the Northern Territory Parliament and to the community of Katherine. | |
| Stuart John Richey | For service to the commercial fishing industry, particularly the promotion of sustainable utilisation of Commonwealth-managed fisheries resources and the development of new national marine policies and safety legislation. | |
| Professor Richard Ernest Ruffin | For service to respiratory medicine as a leading clinician, researcher, educator and mentor to colleagues. | |
| Edmund John Ryan | For service to the community through the restoration and upgrading of historic buildings, particularly places of worship. | |
| Dr Denis Allan Saunders | For service to nature conservation, particularly through the study of Australian birds and the development of landscape ecology in Australia. | |
| Dr Jillian Ruth Sewell | For service to paediatrics and improvements in children's health care as a consultant, administrator and educator. | |
| Kevin Will Seymour | For service to business, to the racing industry, and to the community through the Brisbane Housing Company. | |
| Joan Mary Sheldon | For service to the Queensland Parliament, to support for a range of cultural organisations, and to issues affecting women. | |
| Emeritus Professor Leonard Kelman Stevens | For service to civil engineering, particularly through the theory and practice of structural engineering, and to tertiary education as an educator and administrator. | |
| Dr Michael Maurice Stevens | For service to medicine, particularly through paediatric oncology and paediatric palliative care. | |
| Gary Leon Sturgess | For service to public administration and as an adviser to government in the development of public policy. | |
| Professor Peter Swannell | For service to higher education, particularly through the advancement of distance education and on-line learning opportunities, to engineering as a researcher and teacher, and to the community. | |
| Christopher Bruce Tassell | For service to the arts and cultural development as Director of the Queen Victoria Museum and Art Gallery, to regional museums, and to heritage preservation. | |
| Dr Malcolm Percy Tester | For service to medicine in the field of ophthalmology through strategies to decrease diabetic eye disease in Fiji, particularly through the establishment of health facilities and provision of specialist training for Fijian medical officers. | |
| Dr Ashleigh Clifford Thomas | For service to medicine, particularly in the field of Indigenous health in rural and remote areas, and through the Royal Flying Doctor Service of Australia. | |
| David Francis Thompson | For service to the community in the areas of employment, education and training, particularly through the National Employment Services Association. | |
| Brian Edward Thomson | For service to the arts as a set and production designer for theatre, film, special events and opera, both nationally and internationally. | |
| Colin Logan Thomson | For service to business and commerce through providing leadership within the credit union movement, and to the community through support for Stewart House, Sydney. | |
| Geoffrey William Torney | For service to the legal profession, to the community of Ballarat, and to the thoroughbred horseracing industry. | |
| Dr Penelope Estelle Tripcony | For service to the Indigenous community, particularly in the field of education as an administrator, policy adviser, researcher and educator. | |
| Muriel Mumthelang Van Der Byl | For service to the Indigenous community through the promotion of art and culture and as an advocate for social justice. | |
| Robert Ward | For service to the accounting profession and to the community through sporting associations. | |
| Mark Edward Waugh | For service to cricket as a player and to the community. | |
| Hermann Johann Weber | For service to the community of Alice Springs through a range of local government, health, education, business and service organisations. | |
| Patricia Helen Wessing | For service to conservation, particularly through the Tasmanian Conservation Trust and through support for the establishment of the Tasmanian Wilderness World Heritage Area, and to education. | |
| Peter Snowden Wilson | For service to business and industry, particularly through the development of workplace reforms in the areas of safety, rehabilitation and compensation, and to the community. | |
| Ronald Stanley Yuryevich | For service to local government, particularly to the community of Kalgoorlie-Boulder. | |

==== Military Division ====
| Branch | Recipient | Citation | Notes |
|---|---|---|---|
| Navy | Commodore Tim James Barter | For exceptional service to the Royal Australian Navy as Director Navy Weapons Systems and Director General Navy Systems and Chief Naval Engineer. | |
| Navy | Captain Gerald David Christian | For exceptional service to the Royal Australian Navy as a senior Naval Officer, particularly in support of operational capability. | |
| Navy | Commodore Geoffrey John Geraghty | For exceptional service to the Royal Australian Navy and the Australian Defence Force as the Australian Hydrographer, Hydrographic Force Element Commander and Head of the Australian Defence Staff, London. | |
| Army | Colonel Geoffrey Thomas Peterson | For exceptional performance of duties in the area of international policy, and as the Director of Force Structure — Army, particularly in the fields of capability development, organisational structure, personnel establishments and organisational review. | |
| Army | Colonel Stuart Lyle Smith | For exceptional service to the Australian Army as Commanding Officer 1st Battalion, The Royal Australian Regiment and Commanding Officer AUSBATT VIII East Timor. | |
| Air Force | Air Commodore Rodney Frank Luke | For exceptional service to the Royal Australian Air Force, particularly in the fields of Engineering, Project Development and Training. | |
| Air Force | Group Captain Anthony Vincent Needham | For exceptional service as the Director of Group Function Management, Air Force Headquarters and Director Personnel Officers — Air Force. | |
| Air Force | Wing Commander John Frederick Teager | For exceptional service to the Royal Australian Air Force as Staff Officer within Capability Development and Commanding Officer Joint Electronic Warfare Operational Support Unit. | |

=== Medal of the Order of Australia (OAM) ===
==== General Division ====
| Recipient | Citation | Notes |
|---|---|---|
| Mary Thelma Akers | For service to the community, particularly to the preservation of local history through the Sovereign Hill Museums Association, and to education through the University of Ballarat. | |
| Joan May Andrews | For service to the community through health, aged care and disability support services on the Central Coast of New South Wales. | |
| Janet Anne Annear | For service to education, particularly in the central region of Western Australia, and to the community through the Parkerville Children's Home. | |
| Kenneth James Arkwright | For service to business and commerce, particularly to retail trade in Western Australia, and to the Jewish community. | |
| Neil Armstrong | For service to the community, particularly through the Australian Lions Foundations and the Lions Rheumatism and Arthritis Medical Research Foundation. | |
| Rita Maria Artis | For service to sport, particularly cricket administration as an official scorer, and to the community | |
| Eric Ivan Ashby | For service to the wool and sheep meat industry, particularly through pioneering the development of the Polwarth breed, and to local government. | |
| Benjamin James Austin | For service to sport as a Gold Medallist at the Athens 2004 Paralympic Games. | |
| Dr K Suresh Badami | For service to the community of Baradine, particularly through the establishment of multi-purpose health facilities, and as a medical practitioner. | |
| Joyce Melva Badgery | For service to the community through the Friends of the South Australian Museum, particularly the establishment and management of the volunteer guide program. | |
| Howard Keith Bailey | For service to the community of Kadina, particularly through the preservation and promotion of local history and heritage. | |
| Margaret Ruth Baker | For service to the community through a range of organisations, particularly in relation to mental health services, and to education. | |
| Suzanne Elspeth Balogh | For service to sport as a Gold Medallist at the Athens 2004 Olympic Games. | |
| Ian Douglas Baulch | For service to the community of Geelong through a range of social welfare organisations, particularly the St Vincent de Paul Society. | |
| Ryan Neville Bayley | For service to sport as a Gold Medallist at the Athens 2004 Olympic Games. | |
| Paul M W Benz | For service to sport as a Gold Medallist at the Athens 2004 Paralympic Games. | |
| Dr Louis Bernstein | For service to medicine in the field of cardiology as a clinician, administrator and contributor to professional associations, and to the Jewish community. | |
| Kevin John Best | For service to the arts as a landscape painter, and to the community through fundraising support for a range of charitable organisations. | |
| Anthony John Biddle | For service to sport as a Gold Medallist at the Athens 2004 Paralympic Games. | |
| Gregory Winter Binns | For service to the community of Ballarat, particularly through environmental, arts and heritage organisations. | |
| Neil Allan Blake | For service to conservation and the environment, particularly through the establishment of the Port Phillip EcoCentre. | |
| Dr George Mario Boffa | For service to the Maltese community, and to medicine as an anaesthetist. | |
| Janette Anne Bowman | For service to the community of Flinders Island as the coordinator of the Volunteer Ambulance Officers. | |
| Hugh John Boyle | For service to the community through church, service, welfare and sporting groups, and to education. | |
| John Harry Bracken | For service to the community through a range of social welfare and church organisations, particularly through the provision of emergency accommodation. | |
| Roy Victor Braendler | For service to veterans and their families, and to the community as a fundraiser for the Salvation Army. | |
| Major Peter Gordon Branagan | For service to the community of the Mitchell Shire, particularly to the welfare of ex-Service personnel, and to youth. | |
| Delia Cecilia Brannan | For service to the community through the provision of support and assistance to cardiac patients as leader of Heartbeat Tasmania. | |
| Dr Sandra Louise Bredemeyer | For service to neonatal and perinatal nursing, particularly through the Australian Neonatal Nurses Association. | |
| Michael Gene Brennan | For service to sport as a Gold Medallist at the Athens 2004 Olympic Games. | |
| Alan Robert Broadbent | For service to the community of Heyfield, particularly through health and business organisations. | |
| John David Brooke | For service to local government, to water resource management, to the accountancy profession, and to education. | |
| Peter Graham Brooks | For service to sport as a Gold Medallist at the Athens 2004 Paralympic Games. | |
| Travis Neil Brooks | For service to sport as a Gold Medallist at the Athens 2004 Olympic Games. | |
| Graeme Allen Brown | For service to sport as a Gold Medallist at the Athens 2004 Olympic Games. | |
| Clive Bubb | For service to business and industry through the development of workplace health and safety programs, vocational training for young people, and business advocacy organisations. | |
| Graham Russell Buchner | For service to the community of Warwick through support for tourism, road safety initiatives and local events and activities. | |
| Robert Oliver Burford | For service to the community through fundraising activities supporting aged care, health and youth groups. | |
| John David Burke | For service to the community as a historian and author, particularly through the preservation and promotion of the history of rail transport in Australia and exploration in Antarctica. | |
| David Andrew Burrows | For service to international relations through support for the community of the Western Highlands Province of Papua New Guinea, particularly through projects to provide fresh water in rural areas. | |
| Robert Wilfred Bushby | For service to the welfare of ex-Service personnel and their families. | |
| Kim Patricia Butler | For service through the provision of assistance to victims in the immediate aftermath of the bombings which occurred in Bali on 12 October 2002. | |
| John Maxwell Caddy | For service to choral music, particularly liturgical music through St Patricks Cathedral Choir. | |
| Lindsay John Callaghan | For service to rowing as a competitor, coach and administrator. | |
| Roy Cameron | For service to the community of the Coolah district through the preservation and promotion of local history, as an advocate for the environment and regional tourism, and to local government. | |
| Dianne Olive Campbell | For service to the nursing profession, particularly through the Royal Melbourne Hospital, and as an administrator and contributor to the development of health care standards. | |
| Jeanette Brenton Campbell | For service to the community of Coolamon, particularly through the promotion of tourism and the preservation of local heritage. | |
| Keith Colville Campbell | For service to transport in the field of logistics and supply chain management, particularly through the establishment of an industry body and the subsequent growth of member services. | |
| William John Cantlin | For service to the community of Eurora by providing a high-quality postal service to businesses and residents. | |
| Robert William Carmichael | For service to swimming, particularly through the promotion and development of the sport in rural and regional Victoria. | |
| Sara Maree Carrigan | For service to sport as a Gold Medallist at the Athens 2004 Olympic Games. | |
| Roy Chamberlain | For service to the safety of the travelling community through management of the Australian Travellers Net. | |
| Shirley Chirgwin | For service to the community through the Sutherland Hospital Kiosk Committee. | |
| Leo George Christie | For service to the community through providing advice on governance and fundraising matters to a range of cultural, health, welfare and church organisations. | |
| Francis Clive Churchill | For service to the community through support for social welfare organisations, to people with disabilities, particularly through the Northern Support Services group, and to the emergency services through the United Firefighters Union and Credit Union. | |
| Richard Blackmore Clampett | For service to the pharmacy profession and to the community through service and sporting organisations. | |
| Salvatore Coco | For service to the community through support for medical research, social welfare, arts and conservation organisations, and to the fresh food industry. | |
| Beverley Carlene Coghlan | For service to the community through the Victoria League for Commonwealth Friendship, the Defence Force Wives Association and the Derwent Hospital Auxiliary. | |
| Margaret Dawn Colbourne | For service to music education through the Loddon-Campaspe-Mallee Region Instrument Hire Scheme, and to the community of Bendigo through the performing arts. | |
| Henry James Collins | For service to the community, particularly the ageing, through membership of a range of advisory, health and social support boards and committees. | |
| Sister Elizabeth Leone Collins | For service to the community as a teacher, adult educator and counsellor in the Kimberley region and as the instigator of Centacare Kimberley. | |
| Richard Andrew Colman | For service to sport as a Gold Medallist at the Athens 2004 Paralympic Games. | |
| Austin Sylvester Condon | For service to the community of Laura, particularly through the Returned and Services League of Australia and sporting organisations. | |
| Sergeant Stephen Mark Cook | For service as part of the police joint Bali bombing investigation and victim identification process, known as Operation ALLIANCE. | |
| Dr Clive Trevor Cooke | For service as part of the police joint Bali bombing investigation and victim identification process, known as Operation ALLIANCE. | |
| Thomas William Cooper | For service to the community of the Illawarra region through emergency services and sporting organisations. | |
| Maylean Jessie Cordia | For service to the preservation of the health heritage of Prince Henry Hospital through the Prince Henry Hospital Trained Nurses Association Nursing and Medical Museum. | |
| Captain Pieter Cornelis Cordia | For service to the preservation of the health heritage of Prince Henry Hospital through the Prince Henry Hospital Trained Nurses Association Nursing and Medical Museum. | |
| Brian Colin Coulton | For service to the community through the Donnybrook SubBranch of the Returned and Services League of Australia and through mentoring programs for youth. | |
| Matthew John Cowdrey | For service to sport as a Gold Medallist at the Athens 2004 Paralympic Games. | |
| Vicki Rivers Cowling | For service to the community, particularly as an advocate for children of parents with mental illnesses. | |
| Maxwell George Cox | For service to the Country Fire Authority of Victoria, and to the community of Longwood. | |
| Maud Crang | For service to the community through church, aged care, historical, youth and women's groups. | |
| Debbie Maxine Croft | For service to gymnastics as a coach, judge and competitor, and to the community of Gunnedah. | |
| Donald Cross | For service to the welfare of ex-Service personnel and their families, particularly through the Guards Association of Australasia. | |
| John Andrew Cummins | For service to the Queensland police community, particularly as an advocate for the welfare of officers and their families. | |
| Patricia Rae Dale | For service to the community, particularly through the provision of honorary legal assistance to the New South Wales Synod and the Assembly of the Uniting Church in Australia, and to Amnesty International. | |
| Dr Paul John dArbon | For service to medicine, particularly through the development of geriatric and rehabilitation services. | |
| Moya Therese Davies | For service to the aged community of the Gold Coast, particularly through musical entertainment. | |
| Beryl Joan Davis | For service to the arts, particularly through the establishment and management of the Queensland Performing Arts Museum. | |
| David John Davis | For service to youth, particularly through the provision of activities and educational programs administered by the YMCA. | |
| Gary Stephen Dawson | For service to the community through fundraising and public awareness campaigns relating to child health research. | |
| Peter Douglas Dawson | For service to sport as a Gold Medallist at the Athens 2004 Olympic Games. | |
| Virginia Belle Day | For service to the community of the Caboolture Shire, particularly through the establishment of support services and respite accommodation for carers. | |
| Liam Andrew De Young | For service to sport as a Gold Medallist at the Athens 2004 Olympic Games. | |
| David James Dean | For service to the community through arthritis support organisations, particularly as a counsellor and trainer. | |
| Albert George Dennis | For service to the land and housing industry, to the community through contributing to debate on urban planning and to support for charitable organisations. | |
| George Dow Dick | For service to sport, particularly as an administrator of soccer. | |
| Laurence Patrick Dillon | For service to the community of Geeveston, particularly through organisations promoting civic development and tourism. | |
| Rita Maude Dixon | For service to people with disabilities, particularly through the Gold Coast Branch of The House with No Steps. | |
| Doris Helen Donald | For service to the community, particularly through the Australian Red Cross and the Rockhampton Girls Grammar School Old Girls Association. | |
| Patricia Mary Donovan | For service to the community of the Caboolture Shire, particularly through the establishment of support services and respite accommodation for carers. | |
| Ann Margaret Dooley | For service to the community of Mosman through ex-Service, historical, educational and church organisations, and to support for rural communities in areas affected by drought. | |
| Janice Margaret Douglas | For service to education by fostering academic and sporting achievement and encouraging participation in inter-curricular activities, and to the community of Sandringham, particularly through aged care organisations. | |
| Nancy Elizabeth Douglas-Irving | For service to the community as the founder and administrator of Dialysis Escape Line Australia, a support group for people with kidney disease. | |
| David Henry Doyle | For service to the community of the Coffs Harbour region, particularly through ex-Service welfare organisations. | |
| Darryl Charles Driver | For service as a teacher, guidance officer and advocate for people with special education needs, particularly students with Autistic Spectrum Disorder. | |
| Donna Karen Duncan | For service to the community of Childers through raising awareness of occupational health and safety, providing support in times of emergency, and as a foster carer. | |
| Robert Bruce Duncan | For service to veterans and their families through ex-Service organisations, and to the community. | |
| Trevor John Dunne | For service to veterans and their families, particularly as a welfare advocate. | |
| Gilbert Clifford Durey | For service to the community of Toowoomba through church and sporting organisations. | |
| Jamie Raymond Dwyer | For service to sport as a Gold Medallist at the Athens 2004 Olympic Games. | |
| Superintendent Ross Michael Dwyer | For service as part of the police joint Bali bombing investigation and victim identification process, known as Operation ALLIANCE. | |
| John Thomas Edstein | For service to surf lifesaving and to the community of the Greater Taree area. | |
| Charles Kikis Eftimiou | For service to the community, particularly to the Greek Orthodox Community of New South Wales through youth, sporting, aged care and business and commerce organisations. | |
| Nathan John Eglington | For service to sport as a Gold Medallist at the Athens 2004 Olympic Games. | |
| Brian Waters Eldridge | For service to recreational fishing, to underwater sports and recreational scuba diving, and to the protection of the marine environment. | |
| Archibald John Elliott | For service to the community through a range of service, heritage and church organisations, and to education. | |
| Norman Henry Evans | For service to people with disabilities through the design and manufacture of equipment to increase mobility. | |
| Raymond George Evans | For service to the community of the Redcliffe Peninsula, particularly to veterans and their families. | |
| Ian Joseph Evans | For service to the preservation of the architectural heritage of Australia. | |
| Francis Andrew Eyck | For service to veterans and their families, particularly through the establishment of a monument recognising the service of the Royal Australian Navy Helicopter Flight Vietnam. | |
| Kurt Harry Fearnley | For service to sport as a Gold Medallist at the Athens 2004 Paralympic Games. | |
| Nick Flabouris | For service to the community, particularly through the provision of aged care support services. | |
| Anthony John Flaherty | For service to the community, particularly veterans and their families through fundraising and pension and welfare support. | |
| Sandra Bonnie Fleischman | For service to women with drug and alcohol addictions through the programs of Jarrah House. | |
| Dr Joyce Margaret Ford | For service to medicine, particularly through the development of cancer registries in Australia. | |
| Stephen Anthony Foster | For service to local government in the City of Brighton, and to the community. | |
| Edward John Frame | For service to the welfare of retired mineworkers and their families, and to the community of Cessnock through a range of health, aged care and children's disability organisations. | |
| Barrie Alan Frost | For service to the building and construction industry, particularly through Master Builders Australia. | |
| Elaine Frances Fry | For service to the community, particularly through the Brisbane Water Historical Society and providing support for tourism. | |
| Margaret Lennox Fuller | For service to the community, particularly as a social worker and counsellor and through the provision of prison ministry programs. | |
| John Gall | For service to the community of rural and regional Australia, particularly through the Royal Flying Doctor Service of Australia. | |
| Shirley Dorothy Gall | For service to the community through a range of health, disability, sporting and youth organisations. | |
| Anthony Garnett | For service to the community as a benefactor to a range of charitable and sporting organisations, and to the motor industry. | |
| Fanny Iris Gaskin | For service to the community through the Lavender Lads and Ladies Volunteer Service at the Royal Adelaide Hospital. | |
| Wayne John Geale | For service to the Scouting movement, particularly through the development and implementation of administrative and organisational initiatives. | |
| Bevan Christopher George | For service to sport as a Gold Medallist at the Athens 2004 Olympic Games. | |
| Ian Douglas Gilbertson | For service to the victims and families affected by the bombings which occurred in Bali on 12 October 2002, and to the people of Bali. | |
| Hugh Gilchrist | For service to the community, particularly as a historian of Australian-Greek relations and through support for the work of the Australian Archaeological Institute at Athens. | |
| Dr Bernard Sutcliffe Gilligan | For service to medicine as a neurologist. | |
| Grahame Colin Ginn | For service to education, particularly through the promotion of educational opportunities in Hervey Bay. | |
| Anne Godfrey-Smith | For service to the arts, particularly through a range of theatre, literary and cultural organisations. | |
| John Douglas Graham | For service to the community through a range of organisations, particularly the Wauchope Sub-Branch of the Returned and Services League of Australia. | |
| Christopher Prosser Green | For service to the community of Launceston, particularly through landcare and service club initiatives, and as a benefactor to local organisations. | |
| Dr Leonard Green | For service to the community as a fundraiser for the Royal Institute for Deaf and Blind Children and the Spastic Centre of NSW, and to medicine as a radiologist. | |
| Myrtle Green | For service to the community through a range of health, education, law and women's organisations. | |
| Allan Joseph Gregson | For service to people with disabilities, particularly to athletes as a coach and administrator. | |
| Margaret Joan Gregson | For service to people with disabilities, particularly through sports administration. | |
| Joyce Nance Griffin | For service to youth through the Guiding movement. | |
| David Noel Grimmond | For service to Rugby Union football as a player, selector, coach and administrator, and to the community. | |
| Violet May Groundwater | For service to local government and to the community of Hinchinbrook Shire. | |
| Andrew William Gullotta | For service to pharmacy and to the Italian community. | |
| Michael Thomas Gunn | For service to the community, particularly through exService welfare organisations. | |
| Barbara Guye | For service to the community of Winchelsea through a range of charitable, church, heritage and sporting organisations. | |
| Jennifer Jessie Hadlow | For service to the community, particularly through the ACT Division of the Australian Red Cross. | |
| William John Haesler | For service to jazz music as an administrator, historian, writer, radio presenter and performer. | |
| Benjamin Luke Hall | For service to sport as a Gold Medallist at the Athens 2004 Paralympic Games. | |
| The Reverend Graham Gillies Hall | For service to the community of the Macedon Ranges and to Gisborne Secondary College through the Uniting Church in Australia. | |
| Peter James Hammond | For service to the community, particularly through the Echunga Brigade of the Country Fire Service. | |
| Robert Rodney Hammond | For service to sport as a Gold Medallist at the Athens 2004 Olympic Games. | |
| Hedley Ronald Hancock | For service to the community of Mount Gambier, particularly through journalism and rural show and exService groups. | |
| Nancy Margaret Hancock | For service to women living in rural and remote areas of Queensland and to the communities of Warwick and Killarney. | |
| Morris Morcos Hanna | For service to the community of Marrickville, particularly through local government and the Egyptian Coptic Church. | |
| The Reverend Paul Vincent Hanna | For service to the community of Mount Druitt, particularly through the social welfare programs of the Holy Family Parish. | |
| Brooke Louise Hanson | For service to sport as a Gold Medallist at the Athens 2004 Olympic Games. | |
| Allan John Hardwicke | For service to the community of Great Lakes, particularly through ex-Service and aged care organisations. | |
| Geoffrey Alan Hare | For service to swimming, particularly through Swimming Victoria, as an administrator and official. | |
| Rodney Neville Harris | For service to the community through the development of palliative care services for people with life-threatening illnesses, particularly motor neurone disease. | |
| Robert Joseph Harrison | For service to state and local government, and to the community of Shellharbour. | |
| Huon Marchmont Hassall | For service to primary industry, particularly in the area of farm business management and to international development assistance. | |
| Kenneth Walter Heard | For service to the welfare of veterans and their families, particularly through the Logan and District Sub-Branch of the Returned and Services League of Australia. | |
| Hazel May Hebbes | For service to the community, particularly through the New South Wales Branch of the Australian Society for Inter-Country Aid to Children. | |
| Gregory Edward Heidke | For service to education, particularly in the development of middle schooling practice in Queensland, and by promoting excellence in arts and sports. | |
| Aminta Lucy Hennessy | For service to aviation as a pilot and as an instructor through the establishment of the Australian Association of Flight Instructors. | |
| Laurence Vincent Hession | For service to the community of the Baulkham Hills Shire through historical, emergency services and church organisations. | |
| Anne Gilmour Hetzel | For service to arts and crafts through the Embroiderers Guild of South Australia and the National Textile Museum. | |
| Elizabeth Ann Heydon | For service to the community as a volunteer at the Art Gallery of New South Wales. | |
| Mark Christopher Hickman | For service to sport as a Gold Medallist at the Athens 2004 Olympic Games. | |
| Graham Ormond Hill | For service to optometry through the Victorian College of Optometry and through the establishment of regional eye care services, and to the community. | |
| Ronald Thomas Hill | For service to the community of the Illawarra region, particularly through Lifeline and the Uniting Church in Australia. | |
| Leigh Hillman | For service through the provision of assistance to the community of Bali following the bombings which occurred on 12 October 2002. | |
| Kathleen Hilton | For service to young people through programs and support services of the Ardoch Youth Foundation. | |
| Dr Stephen Lindley Hodby | For service through the provision of immediate medical assistance to victims of the bombings which occurred in Bali on 12 October 2002. | |
| John Layton Hodgetts | For service to the community, particularly through the activities and musical programs of the Derwent Valley Concert Band. | |
| Keith Albert Holmes | For service to local government and to the community of the City of Mandurah. | |
| Myrtle Ellen Hooper | For service to the community of Swan Hill through health, ageing, service and church organisations. | |
| Lindy Hou | For service to sport as a Gold Medallist at the Athens 2004 Paralympic Games. | |
| Gerald Charles Hugo | For service to the community, particularly as a fundraiser for health, ex-Service and sporting organisations, and to local government. | |
| Derek Herman Hunt | For service to the community, particularly through the Anglican Church in Australia and the Mission to Seafarers, and through the Wynnum Manly Eisteddfod. | |
| Patricia Ruth Hunter | For service to youth through the Guiding movement and through sporting and school groups. | |
| Clement James Hurst | For service to the community, particularly through the Clemton Park Conference of the St Vincent de Paul Society. | |
| John Kevin Ireland | For service to the community of Bathurst, particularly through the Catholic Church and the St Vincent de Paul Society. | |
| Colin John Jackson | For service to conservation and the environment through Conservation Volunteers Australia. | |
| Alan Ross James | For service to the arts, particularly through the promotion of Indigenous music and culture. | |
| Philip Norman Jenkyn | For service to the protection and preservation of the environment, particularly heritage sites on the Sydney Harbour foreshore. | |
| Terese Anne Jermyn | For service to the community through Ronald McDonald House Charities. | |
| Barry William Johnson | For service to the welfare of ex-Service personnel and their families, and to the community. | |
| Daphne Gwendoline Johnston | For service to local government and the community of the Hastings region. | |
| Allan Stanton Jones | For service to people with disabilities, particularly through Sailability New South Wales and Sailability Pittwater. | |
| Graham Charles Jones | For service to the insurance industry, particularly through the Insurance Council of Australia, and to the community. | |
| Leisel Marie Jones | For service to sport as a Gold Medallist at the Athens 2004 Olympic Games. | |
| Donald Winston Jowett | For service to sport, particularly athletics, as an administrator, technical official and coach, and to the community through church and welfare organisations. | |
| Dr Peter Stuart Joyner | For service to medicine, particularly the advancement of rural medicine, and to the community of Mannum as a medical practitioner. | |
| Dr Mangalore Ajit Kamath | For service to medicine as a general practitioner and to the community of Temora. | |
| Ona Kapocius | For service to the Lithuanian community of Sydney, particularly through the Sydney Lithuanian Women’s Social Services Association. | |
| Jack Kasses | For service to the community through a range of organisations, particularly in relation to fundraising for cancer research and support for families of children with cancer. | |
| Suzanne Helen Kavanagh | For service to nursing and to the community of the Bauhinia Shire. | |
| Mark Craig Keatinge | For service through the provision of assistance to victims in the immediate aftermath of the bombings which occurred in Bali on 12 October 2002. | |
| George Keen | For service to the Jewish community of Sydney, particularly through the programs of The Central Synagogue and other Jewish communal organisations. | |
| Arthur Ronald Kennedy | For service to the community, particularly through the Royal Australian Artillery Historical Company and other historical societies. | |
| Audrey Alwynne Kennon | For service to the development and promotion of women’s golf in the Northern Territory. | |
| John Samuel Kitchen | For service to local government in the Capel Shire, and to the community through a range of organisations. | |
| Dr Stephen Colin Knott | For service as part of the police joint Bali bombing investigation and victim identification process, known as Operation ALLIANCE. | |
| Mark William Knowles | For service to sport as a Gold Medallist at the Athens 2004 Olympic Games. | |
| Dorothy Dawn Koehler | For service to the community of Maroochydore, particularly veterans and their families. | |
| Alan James Kohler | For service to the community through a range of aged care, service and church groups. | |
| Sister Mary Paul Kontista | For service to the community as a school teacher, and through church and welfare roles. | |
| Marie Kuchenmeister | For service to young people with special needs, particularly through the provision of employment opportunities. | |
| Marguerite Kurschner | For service to people with disabilities through the Riding for the Disabled Association; to physiotherapy as practitioner and teacher; and to the community, particularly through aged care organisations. | |
| Samuel Kutner | For service to people with physical disabilities through Technical Aid to the Disabled (NSW). | |
| John David Laidlaw | For service to the apparel manufacturing industry as a leader, particularly through support for regional industry growth and employment, and to the community through support for charitable organisations. | |
| Brett Daniel Lancaster | For service to sport as a Gold Medallist at the Athens 2004 Olympic Games. | |
| June Ann Le Pla | For service to the community of Hastings through a range of organisations. | |
| Dr Chee-Meng Lee | For service to the community of Coober Pedy as a visiting surgeon to the district. | |
| Robyn Jennifer Lenn | For service to the Jewish community through the National Council of Jewish Women. | |
| Peter Marks Lenny | For service to the Jewish community of Western Australia. | |
| Rachel Rosy Lenny | For service to the Jewish community of Perth through a range of Jewish communal organisations. | |
| Lisbeth Constance Lenton | For service to sport as a Gold Medallist at the Athens 2004 Olympic Games. | |
| Sergeant Kimberley Harold Limbrick | For service as part of the police joint Bali bombing investigation and victim identification process, known as Operation ALLIANCE. | |
| Janelle Mary Lindsay | For service to sport as a Gold Medallist at the Athens 2004 Paralympic Games. | |
| Dr Che-Sam Lo | For service to community health in the field of clinical nutrition, and to the Chinese community through a range of organisations. | |
| Edward Whitmore Logan | For service to the community of Forest Hill, particularly veterans and their families through the Laidley Sub-Branch of the Returned and Services League of Australia. | |
| Winsome Kathleen Long | For service to hockey as a player, umpire and administrator, and through the promotion of young women’s participation. | |
| Marjorie Ann Luck | For service to the arts as an administrator for a range of arts organisations in Tasmania, and to the women’s and union movements in Tasmania. | |
| Olwyn Bernice Mackenzie | For service to the community through a range of social welfare organisations, particularly in the central Sydney area. | |
| Dr Hugh Marquis Mackinnon | For service to the community, particularly through establishing programs for the treatment of and recovery from drug and alcohol addictions as Founder and Chairman of Oxford Houses of Australia, and to business and commerce. | |
| Hazel Gloria Mader | For service to the community of the Barossa Valley as a vocalist and as the Founder and Conductor of the St Petri Singers. | |
| Ian Robertson Mann | For service to the community of the Murraylands region, particularly through local government, and support for natural resource management and agriculture. | |
| Phyllis Elaine Mann | For service to the welfare of ex-Service personnel and their families. | |
| Arthur Joshua Marshman | For service to the community as a supporter of initiatives assisting people from culturally and linguistically diverse backgrounds to settle in Australia and through contributions to the development of aged and palliative care services. | |
| Jenifer Margaret Mayne | For service to the community through support for charitable organisations, particularly through the Blue Chip Committee of Australian Red Cross, Victoria. | |
| Olive Alvena Maywald | For service to education through student welfare, and to gymnastics. | |
| Donald John Mazzucchelli | For service to youth, particularly business development training, and to the community. | |
| Michael Anthony McCann | For service to sport as a Gold Medallist at the Athens 2004 Olympic Games. | |
| Aileen Nancy McCarthy | For service to the community, particularly through the Rockdale Community Centre. | |
| John Edwin McClymont | For service to the community, particularly through the Parramatta and District Historical Society. | |
| Ian Peter McConnochie | For service to veterans and their families through a range of ex-Service organisations. | |
| Robert Thomas McCormick | For service to the community of Hay through local government and a range of rural organisations. | |
| Lorraine Lillian McDonald | For service to the conservation and care of injured and orphaned native animals in northern Tasmania. | |
| Dr John Francis McEencroe | For service to medicine as a general practitioner and administrator through the General Practice Divisions-Victoria, and to the community. | |
| Bradley John McGee | For service to sport as a Gold Medallist at the Athens 2004 Olympic Games. | |
| Florence Mary McGee | For service to the community of the Sutherland Shire through the St Vincent de Paul Society. | |
| Susan Elizabeth McGinn | For service to the dairy industry and as a role model for women in agriculture. | |
| Pauline Margaret McKenzie | For service to the community through support for social welfare and disability services, and through promotion of international humanitarian aid. | |
| Sergeant Scott Andrew McLaren | For service as part of the police joint Bali bombing investigation and victim identification process, known as Operation ALLIANCE. | |
| The Rev Father Francis Anthony McLaughlin | For service to the community through the Catholic Church. | |
| Dorothy Marian McMurray | For service to the community in the Hunter region, particularly in the area of care for the aged. | |
| John Leo McNamara | For service to the community of the Illawarra region, particularly as a poet, author and historian. | |
| Sheila Mary McNamara | For service to the community of Quirindi, particularly through the St Vincent de Paul Society and the Australian Kidney Foundation. | |
| Dr William Raymond McNeil | For service through the provision of immediate medical assistance to victims of the bombings which occurred in Bali on 12 October 2002. | |
| Daniel William McNeill | For service to education and to the community of Tasmania. | |
| Daphne Jane McPherson | For service to the community, particularly through the Women’s Auxiliary of the Yamba Sub-Branch of the Returned and Services League of Australia and the Maclean Lower Clarence Meals on Wheels Service. | |
| Mark Joseph McRae | For service to the Legislative Assembly for the Australian Capital Territory and the Australian Parliament, particularly through encouraging improvement in the standards of parliamentary practice and procedure. | |
| Anna Maree Meares | For service to sport as a Gold Medallist at the Athens 2004 Olympic Games. | |
| The Rev Father Gerald Anthony Medici | For service to the community of Thornbury, particularly through St Marys Catholic Parish. | |
| Dr John Stanton Mellick | For service to the community, particularly through the restoration of St Pauls Presbyterian Church, and to Australian cultural studies. | |
| Frank Alfred Millburn | For service to the community of the Australian Capital Territory through a range of health, service and sporting organisations. | |
| Lilian Ada Miller | For service to the communities of Camooweal and Mount Isa through a range of cultural and historical organisations, particularly the National Trust of Queensland and the Country Women’s Association of Australia. | |
| John Willoughby Miller | For service to lawn bowls, particularly as an administrator, and to the community through Australian Red Cross. | |
| Alice Mary Mills | For service to sport as a Gold Medallist at the Athens 2004 Olympic Games. | |
| Alec Henry Morris | For service to the welfare of veterans and their families, particularly through the Kedron-Wavell Sub-Branch of the Returned and Services League of Australia. | |
| Susan Elizabeth Morris | For service to the vocational education and training sector. | |
| Stephen Martin Mowlam | For service to sport as a Gold Medallist at the Athens 2004 Olympic Games. | |
| Beryl Yvonne Mulder | For service to the community through ethnic, migrant welfare and women’s organisations, particularly the Multicultural Council of the Northern Territory and the Association of Non-English Speaking Background Women of Australia. | |
| William Edward Mulham | For service as a contributor to the botanical and ecological knowledge of semi-arid Australia, and to the community of Deniliquin. | |
| James Joseph Murphy | For service to journalism and sport through the Ballarat Courier, the Ballarat Sports Foundation and the Ballarat Sports Hall of Fame. | |
| Kenneth Spencer Nall | For service to the community of Geelong through a range of educational, social welfare, religious and service organisations. | |
| Chantelle Lee Newbery | For service to sport as a Gold Medallist at the Athens 2004 Olympic Games. | |
| Dr Tien Manh Nguyen | For service to the Vietnamese community in Australia and overseas, particularly as an advocate for refugees and refugee issues. | |
| Margaret Jane Nicholas | For service to the craft of hand embroidery as an artist, author and teacher. | |
| Harold John Noll | For service to the community of Port Augusta, particularly through the local ambulance service and grief counselling and palliative care. | |
| David Keith Norrish | For service to veterans and their families, particularly through the 2/16th Australian Infantry Battalion AIF Association. | |
| Mary Pauline Noyce | For service to the community, particularly through the Sisters of Charity Outreach program. | |
| William Wightman O'Brien | For service to the community of Toowoomba through a range of organisations, including the Australia Day Celebrations Committee, the Cobb and Co Museum and the St Vincent de Paul Society. | |
| Stuart O'Grady | For service to sport as a Gold Medallist at the Athens 2004 Olympic Games. | |
| Kevin Albert O'Keefe | For service to the community of the Macarthur district, particularly through corporate sponsorship of local and regional organisations, and to business. | |
| Pamela Margaret Oborn | For service to the community through the recording and preservation of the history and heritage of Mitcham Village. | |
| Kenneth Charles Olah | For service to the community of the St George and Canterbury-Bankstown area, particularly through activities promoting inter-cultural harmony and services for youth. | |
| Robert Ellery Oswald | For service to the community through a range of sporting and service organisations, and to local government as an administrator. | |
| Patricia Jeannette Page | For service to the community of Beacon Hill, particularly through the Beacon Hill Rural Fire Brigade, and to youth through the Guiding movement. | |
| Robert Ernest Pankhurst | For service to the community, particularly to people with disabilities through the provision of accommodation services and employment opportunities. | |
| Meryl Ellen Papas | For service to rhythmic gymnastics as a coach, choreographer and judge, and to the community. | |
| Kevin Phillip Parish | For service to the community through organisations supporting commuters, particularly on the Central Coast of New South Wales. | |
| James Parkinson | For service through the provision of assistance to victims in the immediate aftermath of the bombings which occurred in Bali on 12 October 2002. | |
| Philip Brian Paul | For service to the real estate industry through the Real Estate Institute of New South Wales and the Australian Property Institute, and to the community of Hurstville. | |
| Noel Andrew Payne | For service to the welfare of veterans through the Naval Association of Australia. | |
| Dr Peter Murray Pearce | For service to medicine and to the community, particularly through support services for homeless people and those with a drug or alcohol dependency. | |
| Noreen Myra Pendergast | For service to the community of the Snowy Monaro region through organisations including the Jindabyne Rodeo Committee, the Man from Snowy River Committee and the Sir William Hudson Memorial Nursing Home, and to local government. | |
| Ronald John Perry | For service to the community as a counsellor, particularly as one of the founders of the Psychotherapy and Counselling Federation of Australia. | |
| George Petersen | For service to the community, particularly through the Fairfield City Museum and sporting organisations. | |
| Rebecca Roberta Pierce | For service to child protection through Good Beginnings Australia and the National Association for Prevention of Child Abuse and Neglect as the designer of community awareness and education materials. | |
| Graham Patrick Pittaway | For service to the community through local government and a range of health, business, and educational organisations. | |
| Muriel Ruth Plain | For service to the community of Warialda, particularly through service, aged care and church groups. | |
| Brian Ernest Pollard | For service to the community, particularly aged care and educational organisations, and to the accountancy profession. | |
| Gilana Lea Poore | For service through the provision of assistance to victims in the immediate aftermath of the bombings which occurred in Bali on 12 October 2002, and subsequently to the people of Bali. | |
| Margaret Elaine Powell | For service to the community, particularly through healing ministries and providing support to young people. | |
| Christopher Hugh Pratten | For service to the environment and to the conservation of natural and built heritage areas as a grazier, educator and administrator. | |
| Cecily Mackney Primmer | For service to the community of Rockhampton, particularly through service, aged care and educational organisations. | |
| Senior Constable Michael David Prosser | For service as part of the police joint Bali bombing investigation and victim identification process, known as Operation ALLIANCE. | |
| Garth George Prowd | For service to sport through marketing and organising events, particularly triathlons. | |
| Keith Joseph Pyne | For service to ex-Service personnel through the City of Sydney Sub-Branch of the Returned and Services League of Australia, and to the community, particularly as a supporter of the activities of Camp Quality. | |
| Senior Sergeant Kenneth Renald Rach | For service as part of the police joint Bali bombing investigation and victim identification process, known as Operation ALLIANCE. | |
| Jack Ian Raggatt | For service to the community, particularly through organisations providing support for older people. | |
| Nelun Bandara Rajapakse | For service to the community, particularly through fundraising support for programs promoting awareness of the need for early detection and treatment of breast cancer. | |
| Neil Risby Rawson | For service to the community of Ulverstone, particularly through sporting and service organisations. | |
| Geraldine Mary Reardon | For service to the community of Roma, particularly through cancer support and church organisations. | |
| Norman Colin Reid | For service to the community through the Anglican Church of Australia, the independent schools’ sector, and the completion of St John’s Cathedral Brisbane. | |
| Wendy Richardson | For service to the arts and to the community as a playwright and producer, particularly through chronicling the social, cultural and political history of events affecting the Illawarra region. | |
| William Rupert Richardson | For service to the community of Barraba through local government and through contributions to the Anglican Church, service groups and health care facilities. | |
| Lewis John Roberts | For service to natural history and the documentation of biodiversity in north Queensland. | |
| The Rev Dr Dennis Cecil Robinson | For service to the community of Queensland through the Uniting Church in Australia. | |
| Dr James Barry Roche | For service to medicine in the field of obstetrics and gynaecology and to the Crown Street Women’s Hospital. | |
| Giaan Leigh Rooney | For service to sport as a Gold Medallist at the Athens 2004 Olympic Games. | |
| Joseph Alexander Rowland | For service to the community through the Hinkler House Memorial Museum. | |
| Dr Bruce David Rumbold | For service to the community in the fields of pastoral and palliative care, particularly as an educator. | |
| Sarah Michelle Ryan | For service to sport as a Gold Medallist at the Athens 2004 Olympic Games. | |
| Sebastiano Saitta | For service to the community of the Burdekin region through a range of aged care, health, service and welfare organisations. | |
| William Ralph Sawrey | For service to the community of Nambour, particularly through ex-Service organisations. | |
| Jessicah Lee Schipper | For service to sport as a Gold Medallist at the Athens 2004 Olympic Games. | |
| Grant Luke Schubert | For service to sport as a Gold Medallist at the Athens 2004 Olympic Games. | |
| Gordon Bryant Schwartz | For service to journalism and sport in South Australia. | |
| Charles Ernest Sconce | For service to the community, particularly through Lions International and local government. | |
| Enid Kathleen Scott | For service to the community as a contributor to the establishment of private health care facilities in the Lake Macquarie region. | |
| Margaret Mary Scott | For service to public health, particularly through the development of nursing services in the Hunter region, and to the community. | |
| John Edward Searle | For service to the welfare of ex-Service personnel and their families. | |
| Graham Phillip Segal | For service to the community, particularly as a proponent for the recognition of different cultural and religious practices within the Australian legal system. | |
| Narelle Sellar | For service to the community through the provision of quality child care facilities and programs, and to the enhancement of professional training. | |
| Ivan Henry Shaw | For service to primary industry through the invention of and training in the use of mechanised production systems for grape growers, and as a contributor to industry groups. | |
| William Shelley | For service to the community, particularly through sporting, service and welfare groups, and to education. | |
| Professor Sankar Nath Sinha | For service to medicine, particularly through wound care practice, and to medical education. | |
| Arthur Leonard Smaills | For service to the community as an administrator of and volunteer with the Meals on Wheels organisation in New South Wales. | |
| Marjorie Eileen Smith | For service to the community as an advocate and representative for carers, and through support for Zonta International. | |
| Helen Margaret Smith | For service to the community, particularly through support for the programs and activities of the Eye Surgery Foundation. | |
| John Arthur Snewin | For service to the community through a range of ex-Service groups, particularly the Beaufort Squadrons Association of Australia. | |
| Max Charles Solling | For service to the community, particularly through researching, recording and publishing the history of Glebe. | |
| James Arthur Southwood | For service to music education, particularly through the development of curricular and choral groups. | |
| Roy Patrick Spagnolo | For service to the community through a range of organisations, particularly the Italian Affair Committee. | |
| Gaynor Spies | For service to the conservation of urban bushland areas, particularly through the Willoughby Environmental Protection Association. | |
| Nanette Squire | For service to the community, particularly through the Glengollan Village for Aged People and the Guiding movement. | |
| Peter Stathopoulos | For service to the community, particularly through ex-Service, cadet and emergency services groups. | |
| Christine Jennifer Steele Scott | For service to the community, particularly through the Friends of the Botanic Gardens of Adelaide and Australia’s Open Garden Scheme. | |
| Dr Jeffrey Peter Steinweg | For service to sports medicine, particularly through the Australasian College of Sports Physicians. | |
| Judie Jane Stephens | For service to the community as an advocate for accident victims suffering serious permanent impairments. | |
| Barry Allan Stewart | For service to the community of Western Sydney, particularly through a range of seniors’ organisations and local church and welfare groups. | |
| Kial Douglas Stewart | For service to sport as a Gold Medallist at the Athens 2004 Paralympic Games. | |
| Lynette Valmay Stewart | For service to people with intellectual disabilities, particularly through involvement in the establishment of respite and accommodation services in the Ipswich region and the formation of the Down Syndrome Association of Queensland. | |
| James Stirling | For service to the community of the Macleay district, particularly through sporting groups, to Indigenous health, and to primary education. | |
| Dorothy Stringer | For service to the community as a fundraiser for a range of charitable organisations, particularly in support of brain injured children. | |
| Gwenda Mary Stutchbury | For service as a volunteer at St Lucy’s School for Vision Impaired Children. | |
| Denis Edward Suess | For service to the community of the Illawarra region, particularly through support for service, sporting and business organisations. | |
| The Rev Dr Peter Leonard Swain | For service to the Uniting Church in Australia and to religious education, particularly through Newington College and the Australian Association for Religious Education. | |
| Yvonne Frances Talbott | For service to people with disabilities, particularly through the New South Wales Wheelchair Sports Association. | |
| Roger John Taylor | For service to education through promoting academic excellence and fostering participation in extra-curricular activities. | |
| Barbara Anna Taylor-Chantler | For service as a nursing administrator with the United Nations Interim Administration Mission in Kosovo. | |
| Petria Ann Thomas | For service to sport as a Gold Medallist at the Athens 2004 Olympic Games. | |
| Joyce Marjorie Thorn | For service to the community of Camden through a range of welfare, church, historical and craft groups. | |
| Gaven Gerald Thurlow | For service to the community, particularly through the Jimboomba Sub-Branch of the Returned and Services League of Australia and the Jimboomba Branch of the Veterans’ Support and Advocacy Service Australia. | |
| Stephen Kendall Tizzard | For service to the aviation industry through the aero club movement as an administrator and instructor. | |
| Francis Toope | For service to the community of the City of Holroyd, particularly as a contributor to the development of sporting facilities in the area. | |
| Betty Joy Tothill | For service to the community, particularly through the South Australian Country Women’s Association, and through a range of school, parent and choral groups. | |
| Dr David James Tranter | For service to the community of the Wingecarribee Shire, particularly in the areas of environmental and local heritage conservation. | |
| Helen Ada Tranter | For service to the community of the Wingecarribee Shire, particularly in the areas of environmental and local heritage conservation. | |
| Thomas Michael Treston | For service to the community as a fundraiser for and supporter of social welfare, school and sporting groups. | |
| Anthony Charles Trimingham | For service to the community through the establishment of the organisation Family Drug Support. | |
| Floris Tucker | For service to the community of Quirindi through the Royal Far West Children’s Health Scheme, the Australian Red Cross and the Quirindi and District Historical Society. | |
| Dr James Edward Turner | For service to medicine and to the Illawarra region as a general practitioner. | |
| Dr Pamela Mary Turnock | For service to rural medicine and to the community of St George as a general practitioner. | |
| Chhay Hua Ung | For service to the Khmer community in New South Wales, particularly through the Cambodian Buddhist Temple. | |
| Anthony John Uren | For service to the community of Campbelltown, particularly through the North Eastern Community Hospital. | |
| Vincent John Vandeleur | For service to the law and to the community of Innisfail, particularly through educational, church and cultural organisations. | |
| Alexander Vellacott | For service to the taxi industry in Western Australia. | |
| Jean Florence Vincent | For service as a volunteer at St Lucy’s School for Vision Impaired Children. | |
| Mark John Walton | For service to music and to music education through the Sydney Conservatorium of Music and the use of video-conferencing facilities, and through nurturing the talent of students from regional areas. | |
| Judith Suzanne Ward | For service to people with intellectual disabilities as a foster parent, carer and fundraiser. | |
| Cynthia Constance Watsford | For service to the visual arts in the Canberra region. | |
| Karen Janice Watson | For service to nursing as an administrator, educator and practitioner. | |
| Gwenda June Webber | For service to the community of Loxton Waikerie, particularly through the Crippled Children’s Association of South Australia, Waikerie Progress Association and the Guiding movement. | |
| Garnet James Webster | For service to the community, particularly through the Anglican Church in the Diocese of Canberra and Goulburn. | |
| Matthew Wayne Wells | For service to sport as a Gold Medallist at the Athens 2004 Olympic Games. | |
| Rod Robert Welsh | For service to sport as a Gold Medallist at the Athens 2004 Paralympic Games. | |
| Keith White | For service to local government and to the community of the Berrigan Shire, particularly through sporting organisations, and to the Murray Rural Lands Protection Board. | |
| Chris Anne Whiteside | For service to the community through the Youth Hostels Association of South Australia and the Duke of Edinburgh’s Award in Australia. | |
| Leon Albert Wiegard | For service to sport, particularly the Olympic movement as an administrator, and to the community through a range of charitable organisations. | |
| Teena Wilcock | For service to the arts, particularly in the regional and rural communities of Queensland, and to the community through the pony club and rural show movements. | |
| Melvie Joan Wilson | For service to the community of Tamworth, particularly through support for veterans and their families. | |
| Chantel Louise Wolfenden | For service to sport as a Gold Medallist at the Athens 2004 Paralympic Games. | |
| Stephen Brian Wooldridge | For service to sport as a Gold Medallist at the Athens 2004 Olympic Games. | |
| The Rev Roy Arthur Wotton | For service to the Anglican Church in Australia, particularly through the pastoral care of veterans and their families. | |
| Florence Ethel Yapp | For service to the community as a fundraiser for St Luke’s Nursing Service. | |
| Dr Shelley Roma Yeo | For service to science education particularly through the Science Teachers Association of Western Australia. | |
| Tom York | For service to basketball and handball as an administrator and to the Jewish community, particularly through the Maccabi movement | |

==== Military Division ====
| Branch | Recipient | Citation | Notes |
|---|---|---|---|
| Navy | Warrant Officer David Thomas Baker | For meritorious service to the Royal Australian Navy, particularly in the field of small arms and gunnery training. | |
| Navy | Lieutenant Russell George Cronin | For meritorious service as the Executive Officer at Australian Clearance Diving Team Four, particularly in the fields of training and operational capability. | |
| Army | Warrant Officer Class 1 Alan Bruce Gillman CSM | For meritorious service to the Australian Army as Regimental Sergeant Major of the Royal Military College of Australia and as Regimental Sergeant Major of 1st Battalion, The Royal Australian Regiment. | |
| Army | Warrant Officer Class 1 Brett Douglas Pates | For meritorious service to the Australian Army as Company Sergeant Major of the Battalion Support Group East Timor, Company Sergeant Major Supply Company, 3rd Combat Service Support Battalion, and as the Regimental Sergeant Major, 7th Combat Service Support Battalion. | |
| Army | Captain Michael Andrew Pert | For meritorious service to the Australian Intelligence Corps, particularly as an instructor in the Human Intelligence Wing at the Defence Intelligence Training Centre. | |
| Army | Warrant Officer Class 1 Rodrick Malcolm Scott MG | For meritorious service to the Australian Army performing the duties of Regimental Sergeant Major of the 1st Health Support Battalion and Headquarters 5th Brigade. | |
| Army | Major Leighton Alwyn Shepherd | For meritorious service to the Military Parachute Training School, particularly in the areas of high altitude parachute operations and in training and safety procedures. | |
| Air Force | Warrant Officer Graeme Anthony Clark | For meritorious service to the Royal Australian Air Force in the development of the C130J Hercules in the Airborne Operations role. | |
| Air Force | Warrant Officer Andrew William Duff | For meritorious service as Logistics Engineer at the Training Aircraft System Program Office from January 1998 to April 2004, particularly his leadership in overcoming airworthiness issues with avionics systems on the PC-9 aircraft in 2003. | |

== Meritorious Service ==
=== Public Service Medal (PSM) ===
| Recipient | Citation |
|---|---|
| Louie John Andreatta | For outstanding public service through his contribution to the implementation of initiatives to strengthen the Australian health care system, particularly access to medical services through Medicare. |
| Dr Evan Philip Arthur | For outstanding public service, particularly to the higher education and research sector, through the development and implementation of the Australian Research and Education Network. |
| Dr Sandra Ann Baxendell | For outstanding public service and leadership, implementation of innovative processes and development of a supportive and productive work environment. |
| Lindsay Wilfred Best | For outstanding public service to nature conservation. |
| Howard Craig Brown | For outstanding public service in protecting and promoting Australia's foreign policy interests, particularly as High Commissioner to Pakistan and Ambassador to Afghanistan. |
| Kenneth Michael Collis | For outstanding public service, particularly to regional transport planning within New South Wales. |
| Robert John Correll | For outstanding public service in the development and implementation of improved publicly funded employment services for unemployed people, in particular the Active Participation Model. |
| Patricia Lynne Curran | For outstanding public service through the development of policies for assistance and support for families and oversight of the successful implementation of major Government initiatives within weeks of announcement in the 2004-2005 Budget. |
| Kerry Cecilia Doyle | For outstanding public service, particularly in the NSW Ministry for Science and Medical Research. |
| Jayne Dyer | For outstanding public service as the Head of Public Programs at the National Art School. |
| Kevin James Fitzpatrick | For outstanding public service in the development of innovative solutions to combat taxation non-compliance and the management of taxation planning arrangements. |
| Edward Anderson Gardner | For outstanding public service in the fields of water renewal, rural and urban water use efficiency and water cycle sciences. |
| Beverley Frances Gibbeson | For outstanding public service as the Senior Information Officer, WorkCover Assistance Service. |
| John Anthony Gorrie | For outstanding public service in improving the relationship between the Department of Human Services and the Aboriginal community. |
| James Patrick Gott | For outstanding public service to local government through exemplary leadership and commitment to fostering high quality institutions and infrastructure in rural Queensland. |
| Kerry James Graham | For outstanding public service to local government, particularly in progressing community initiatives that should improve the sustainability of the local community. |
| Josée Deborah Grisard | For outstanding public service, particularly through the development of initiatives that have led to enhancements in public sector administration. |
| Professor Stephen John Hall | For outstanding public service as Director of the Australian Institute of Marine Science. |
| John William Hartwell | For outstanding public service in the development of policies for Australia's resources sector, particularly the liquefied natural gas industry, negotiation of the Timor Sea Treaty and establishment of the National Offshore Petroleum Safety Authority. |
| Stuart Hasic | For outstanding public service, particularly in the provision of computer services to schools within the Southern Region of the NSW Department of Education and Training. |
| Kerrie Anne Heenan | For outstanding public service in curriculum innovation and educational leadership. |
| Peter Joseph Hoey | For outstanding public service in water resource management. |
| Peter Gerard Hughes | For outstanding public service through the development of policies and programs to increase citizenship, multicultural harmony and the settlement of refugees. |
| Rosemary Therese Huxtable | For outstanding public service through her contribution to the development of innovative policies to strengthen the Australian health care system, particularly access to medical services through Medicare. |
| Jill Marie Jessop | For outstanding public service to the Office of Fair Trading, particularly in the management and direction of Aboriginal customer service programs operated across New South Wales. |
| James Michael Killaly | For outstanding public service in the development and implementation of a comprehensive and sustainable taxation compliance framework for large business and enhanced international taxation treaty arrangements. |
| Ian David Killey | For outstanding public service through the provision of legal and legal policy advice to the State of Victoria. |
| Dr Alan Laughlin | For outstanding public service to the NSW Department of Education and Training. |
| Bruce Mackenzie | For outstanding public service to education management, particularly through service to Holmesglen TAFE. |
| Dr William Borthwick Maiden | For outstanding public service within the ACT government school system. |
| Mary Patricia Marsland | For outstanding public service to the public sector building and construction industry. |
| Douglas George Moyle | For outstanding public service in educational and community leadership. |
| Aidan Terence O'Leary | For outstanding public service, particularly to the Canberra Institute of Technology. |
| Dr Edward John Ogden | For outstanding public service to Victoria Police in the area of forensic medicine. |
| Anne Pickles | For outstanding public service as Information Coordinator, NSW Fire Brigades, particularly concerning occupational health and safety. |
| Keith Blore Ridout | For outstanding public service through the delivery of mobile library services to the isolated and often disadvantaged rural communities of East Gippsland. |
| Malcolm James Rodgers | For outstanding public service through corporate and markets regulation, particularly in the development of the Corporations Law Economic Reform Programs. |
| Rona Evelyn Sakko | For outstanding public service as Coordinator, including as a volunteer, of CSIROs Double Helix Science Club in South Australia and her contribution to science education of young people. |
| David William Snape | For outstanding public service, particularly in the field of water management. |
| Perrohean Ruth Sperling | For outstanding public service through her contribution to the development of innovative policies to strengthen the Australian health care system, particularly access to medical services through Medicare. |
| Pietro Ettore Tonello | For outstanding public service as an Agronomist and Extension Officer in the Department of Primary Industries and Fisheries, and in developing and using innovative extension processes. |
| Kenneth Thomas Toogood | For outstanding public service as Principal Registrar of the Supreme and District Courts of Queensland and for enhancing service delivery by Queensland Court Registries. |
| Dr Ronald James Wickes | For outstanding public service in the development of Australia's trade policy, including his contribution to the bilateral free trade agreement between Australia and the United States of America. |
| John Kenneth Wright | For outstanding public service, particularly in the enhancement of computer services provided by the State Library of New South Wales. |
| Professor Helen Margaret Garnett | For outstanding public service as the Executive Director, Australian Nuclear Science and Technology Organisation, particularly the planning and construction of the replacement research reactor at Lucas Heights. |
| Stefan Kudilczak | For outstanding public service to the education and support of students with an intellectual disability and sustained service in leadership with the Australian Air Force Cadets. |

=== Australian Police Medal (APM) ===
| Branch | Recipient |
|---|---|
| Australian Federal Police | Federal Agent Jennifer Helen Hurst |
| Australian Federal Police | Detective Sergeant Robert Walter Peters |
| Australian Federal Police | Federal Agent Peter Edward Phillips |
| New South Wales Police | Superintendent Beverley Ann Blanch |
| New South Wales Police | Inspector Shane William Box |
| New South Wales Police | Superintendent Paul Anthony Carey |
| New South Wales Police | Superintendent Alan John Clarke |
| New South Wales Police | Superintendent Denis John Clifford |
| New South Wales Police | Chief Inspector Garry Parkin |
| New South Wales Police | Detective Inspector Andrew Peter Slattery |
| New South Wales Police | Superintendent Carlene Anne York |
| New South Wales Police | Superintendent Jennifer Ann Young |
| Victoria Police | Senior Sergeant David Thomas Carey |
| Victoria Police | Assistant Commissioner Paul Weston Evans |
| Victoria Police | Police Reservist Francis John Eyre |
| Victoria Police | Superintendent Gordon Alan McLeod |
| Victoria Police | Leading Senior Constable Jonathan Stuart Reader |
| Victoria Police | Senior Constable Anthony Wayne Richardson |
| Queensland Police | Detective Senior Sergeant Gregory Joseph Daniels |
| Queensland Police | Chief Superintendent Alan George Davey |
| Queensland Police | Michael Anthony Huddlestone |
| Queensland Police | Senior Sergeant Michael James Pearson |
| Queensland Police | Assistant Commissioner Ian Duncan Stewart |
| Western Australia Police | Commissioner Karl Joseph O'Callaghan |
| Western Australia Police | Detective Sergeant Jennifer Lea O'Connell |
| Western Australia Police | Senior Sergeant Mark Kenneth Regel |
| South Australia Police | Detective Senior Sergeant Paul Lewandowski |
| South Australia Police | Detective Senior Sergeant Keith Parry-Jones |
| South Australia Police | Superintendent Paul Schramm |
| Tasmania Police | Commander Peter John Edwards |
| Tasmania Police | Inspector John David Talbert |
| Northern Territory Police | Detective Sergeant Lee Gage |
| Northern Territory Police | Senior Constable Andrew Charles Holt |
