= Brain and Mind Research Institute =

Brain and Mind Research Institute may refer to:

- Brain and Mind Centre, Sydney, Australia
- Brain and Mind Research Institute at the University of Ottawa Faculty of Medicine, Ontario, Canada
- Feil Family Brain and Mind Research Institute at Weill Cornell Medicine, New York City, United States
