= European Federation of Autonomic Societies =

- Type: Learned society
- Location: Toulouse
- Region served: Europe
- Key people: Walter Struhal (President)
- Website: www.efasweb.com

The European Federation of Autonomic Societies (EFAS) is a scientific society which aims of coordinate the activity of national autonomic societies within Europe. The focus of these societies is the study of the Autonomic nervous system, particularly clinical aspects of this field. The society was founded in October 1998.

== Meetings ==
EFAS holds an annual congress, organized each year by another national autonomic society. Since the autonomic field in fact overlaps with a number of disciplines, several were held as joint meetings with partnering international societies. Partnering organizations for meetings had been the International Society for Autonomic Neuroscience (2009, 2013, 2015), the European Federation of Neurological Societies (now European Academy of Neurology) (2008, 2012), and the American Autonomic Society (2004, 2007).

The 2018 meeting (which celebrated the 20th anniversary of the society) took place in Vienna; the event was in collaboration with the International Congress of Nerve and Muscle Diseases.

== Education ==
Since 2009, EFAS started to organize regular teaching events, in the beginning with support of the European Federation of Neurological Societies. Motivation to initiate those events were the scarce clinical knowledge in autonomic fields based on the absence of structured training in many European countries. Consequently, EFAS initiated teaching events to promote knowledge. Target group for this initiative are young clinicians, interested in dysautonomia. This teaching initiative evolved and EFAS took effort to have it organized on an annual basis. Currently, one day of the annual congress is dedicated to training young doctors in autonomic evaluation skills (EFAS School).

== Scientific journal and social media ==
The official journal of the society is Clinical Autonomic Research.

In 2017, EFAS started to publish news on Twitter with the Username @EFAS_ANS.

== See also ==
- Clinical Autonomic Research
- European Academy of Neurology
- International Society for Autonomic Neuroscience
