= Shaw Wilson =

Sri Lankan cricketer and educator

Personal information
- Full name: John Devakumar Wilson
- Born: 4 September 1944 (age 82); Jaffna, Northern Province, British Ceylon
- Batting: Left-handed
- Bowling: Leg break

Domestic team information
- Years: Team
- 1977: Oxford University

Career statistics
Competition	First-class
Matches	1
Runs scored	19
Batting average	9.50
100s/50s	–/–
Top score	18
Balls bowled	18
Wickets	0
Bowling average	–
5 wickets in innings	–
10 wickets in match	–
Best bowling	–
Catches/stumpings	–/–
- Source: Cricinfo, 1 June 2020

John Devakumar 'Shaw' Wilson (born 4 September 1944) is a Sri Lankan educator and former first-class cricketer.

Wilson was born at Jaffna in September 1944. He was educated in Colombo at Royal College, where he captained the school cricket team. From there, he went up to Senate of Serampore College in India, where he obtained his bachelor's degree. He then studied for his master's degree at the University of London and Princeton Theological Seminary. Wilson spent time as a research student at Mansfield College at the University of Oxford. While studying at Oxford, he made a single appearance in first-class cricket for Oxford University against Nottinghamshire at Oxford in 1977. Batting twice in the match, he was dismissed for 18 runs in the Oxford first innings by Peter Hacker, while in their second innings he was dismissed without scoring by Bob White.

Once Wilson had completed his studies, he returned to Sri Lanka to become a schoolteacher. He taught at Trinity College in Kandy, where he was also curator of the college's Asgiriya cricket ground, which became Sri Lanka's second Test venue in 1983 when Sri Lanka played Australia there. He later taught at several schools in Australia, before returning to Sri Lanka to teach. In 2015, he became the vice-principal of Wesley College, Colombo. He was appointed vice principal of Trinity College in April 2017.
