= International Society for Autonomic Neuroscience =

- Logo of the International Society for Autonomic Neuroscience
- Founder: Geoffrey Burnstock
- Type: Learned society
- Region served: Worldwide
- Method: Scientific conferences, training grants
- Website: autonomicneuroscience.info

The International Society for Autonomic Neuroscience is a scientific society of researchers studying the autonomic nervous system. The society organizes scientific meetings, publishes a scientific journal, and supports students through awards and travel grants. It is a non-profit and non-governmental organization.

== History ==
The society was founded in 1995, because it was felt that the key international society covering neuroscience, the International Brain Research Organization, was not sufficiently representing research on this part of the nervous system. The first president was Geoffrey Burnstock. Elsewhere, it has been claimed that the society originated because of the Journal of Autonomic Neuroscience, presumably because discussions amongst the early editors identified lack of scientific exchange, at an international level, amongst researchers in the field.

Initially, scientific meetings were organized every 3 years, before settling into a biennial pattern. Meetings have been held in Australia, the United Kingdom, Japan, Canada, France, Brazil, Germany and Italy.

== Journal ==
The official journal of the society is Autonomic Neuroscience: Basic and Clinical. This journal publishes the congress abstracts and supports student poster and presentation prizes.

== Collaboration with regional societies ==
The society collaborates with several autonomic regional societies, having similar aims, in organizing joint meetings. These societies include:

- American Autonomic Society
- European Federation of Autonomic Societies
- Japan Society of Neurovegetative Research
