= Mereological fallacy =

Concept in philosophy of mind

The mereological fallacy is a conceptual error within the philosophy of mind, in which psychological capacities of a person or animal are attributed to the brain or another part of the organism. The argument is associated with neuroscientist Max Bennett and philosopher Peter Hacker, whose Philosophical Foundations of Neuroscience (2003) criticise such attributions in cognitive neuroscience.

Bennett and Hacker distinguish the cognitive processes that enable thinking, from the organism that exercises those capacities. Their argument has been disputed by various philosophers including Daniel Dennett and John Searle.

== Argument ==
According to Bennett and Hacker, the circumstances under which psychological descriptions apply to people and other animals are part of what gives those descriptions their meaning. They argue that describing a brain as perceiving, or deciding, transfers these descriptions to something that does not meet their conditions of application. The resulting statements, on their account, are conceptually confused rather than empirically false.

Bennett and Hacker accept that neural processes make psychological capacities possible. On their account, neuroscience investigates how neural activity enables an animal to see or remember. They claim that it doesn't explain those capacities by assigning sight or memory to the brain itself. They also argue that treating these expressions as harmless metaphors does not resolve the problem when the expressions are used when explaining phenomena like perception or memory.

Harry Smit and Hacker later clarified that the error isn't a strictly invalid inference, it is more precisely, an inappropriate attribution of a property, which may then produce mistaken inferences. In their usage, fallacy has a broader use than in formal logic.

== Background ==
Bennett and Hacker's account draws on Ludwig Wittgenstein's discussion in Philosophical Investigations of the circumstances in which sensations and other psychological attributes can be ascribed to living beings. Smit and Hacker relate their terminology to Anthony Kenny's earlier discussion of the homunculus fallacy. They prefer the mereological terminology because the objection concerns part–whole relations, without requiring the postulation of a miniature person inside the organism.

The argument was debated in Neuroscience and Philosophy: Brain, Mind, and Language (2007), which included criticisms by Dennett and Searle and a reply by Bennett and Hacker.

== Reception ==
Reviewing Bennett and Hacker's book, David W. Schaal welcomed its criticism of dualism and its attention to behavioural criteria for psychological concepts. He nevertheless questioned some restrictions the authors placed on the use of memory concepts in research on non-human animals.

Daniel Dennett defends a modified use of psychological vocabulary for subpersonal mechanisms. On his account, attributing simplified forms of belief to brain components can help explain a person's capacities without treating each component as a complete thinker.

John Searle challenges the role assigned to behavioural criteria. He argues that the evidence used to attribute a psychological state should be distinguished from the state itself, and that Bennett and Hacker's argument confuses these issues.

Paul Churchland appeals to information-processing descriptions in computer science, arguing that talk of storing, retrieving and manipulating information can have an intelligible technical use. Bennett and Hacker respond that producing results consistent with a rule differs from following that rule with understanding. Discussing this exchange, Michael R. W. Dawson argues that a functional explanation decomposes a system's capacities into simpler operations, which need not resemble the behaviour of the system as a whole.

Rom Harré questions whether brains, although parts of human bodies, should also be described as parts of persons. He proposes reformulating the issue through relationships between meanings and the roles of bodily organs in human activities. His account permits describing the hippocampus as an organ for remembering, without identifying neuroscience with psychology.

Hans-Johann Glock defends the category-mistake objection to attributing cognition to brains and their parts, while rejecting the further claim that the brain cannot be described as the organ of cognition.

== See also ==
- Embodied cognition
- Philosophy of neuroscience
