= John Leo McNamara =

Australian historian

John Leo McNamara OAM (1922–2004) was a bushman, poet, historian and author mainly responsible for documenting the life and community of the little-known and now lost Cordeaux River settlement south west of Wollongong.

He was born in 1922 in the Cordeaux Valley and also died there in 2004.

Like the lost town of Sherbrooke near the Cataract Dam on the south coast of New South Wales, Cordeaux was a once-thriving community. It was resumed and par-flooded by the Sydney Catchment Authority who had earmarked the land for water collection as early as the 1860s, just a few years into the establishment of the area for major agriculture.

The resumption began in 1901 and ceased in the early 1950s when only three parcels of freehold land remained (two owned by Ellis McNamara and one owned by Bruce Rees - these were eventually sold to the Sydney Catchment Authority in 2007). Most of the exodus occurred between 1943 and 1946, after a fruit fly epidemic had laid waste to most of the industry that had not already been depleted by the suffering of the Great Depression and Second World War.

His family arrived in the area in the mid-1860s and by 1874 had settled, building a homestead on an existing orchard that was a landmark of the area. After purchase by the family in 1881, it survived until 2006.

== Career ==
McNamara spent his life as an expert timber-getter, or self-referentially, a "bushman", and developed his poetry writing skills in his spare moments.

== Writings ==
It was not until well into his retirement that what was initially a past time became serious and led to his publishing five books towards the end of his life. If it was not for his recording, researching and writing, it is doubtful that, having now disappeared almost without a trace, much would be known of the Cordeaux Valley/River settlement today along with other south coast New South Wales "drowned towns" such as Goondarrin Settlement, Kentish Creek, and Sherbrooke.

The first book published was Memories of Cordeaux, in 1997. This was followed by Of Kembla Colliery and Other Verses (2000), Life at Cordeaux (2000), Village Greens (2003) and Winning Wollongong's Water (2004).

== Recognition ==
He was awarded the OAM in the 2005 Australia Day Honours, for services "to the community of the Illawarra region, particularly as a poet, author and historian".
