= Autonomic Neuroscience: Basic and Clinical =

Autonomic Neuroscience
- Discipline: Autonomic neuroscience
- Language: English
- Edited by: Roy Freeman

Publication details
- Former name: Journal of the Autonomic Nervous System
- History: 1978-present
- Publisher: Elsevier
- Frequency: 8/year
- Open access: Hybrid
- Impact factor: 2.247 (2018)

Standard abbreviations
- ISO 4: Auton. Neurosci.

Indexing
- CODEN: ANUEB2
- ISSN: 1566-0702 (print); 1872-7484 (web)
- OCLC no.: 838647867

Links
- Journal homepage; Online access; Online archive; Journal of the Autonomic Nervous System archives

Autonomic Neuroscience: Basic and Clinical is a peer-reviewed scientific journal covering research on the autonomic nervous system. It is published by Elsevier and is the official journal of the International Society for Autonomic Neuroscience. It was established by Chandler McCluskey Brooks in 1978 as the Journal of the Autonomic Nervous System and obtained its current title in 2000. From 1985, and for many years thereafter, the editor-in-chief was Geoffrey Burnstock (UCL Medical School), who was succeeded by Roy Freeman.

The journal is abstracted and indexed by MEDLINE/PubMed. According to the Journal Citation Reports, the journal has a 2018 impact factor of 2.247.
