= Clinical Autonomic Research =

- Discipline: Neurology
- Language: English
- Edited by: Horacio Kaufmann, Jens Jordan

Publication details
- History: 1991-present
- Publisher: Springer Science+Business Media
- Frequency: Bimonthly
- Impact factor: 4.435 (2020)

Standard abbreviations
- ISO 4: Clin. Auton. Res.

Indexing
- ISSN: 0959-9851 (print); 1619-1560 (web)
- OCLC no.: 311404827

Links
- Journal homepage; Online archive

Clinical Autonomic Research is a bimonthly peer-reviewed medical journal covering research on the autonomic nervous system and its disorders. It was established in 1991 and is published by Springer Science+Business Media. The editors-in-chief are Horacio Kaufmann (New York University School of Medicine) and Jens Jordan (German Aerospace Center). It is the official journal of the American Autonomic Society and the European Federation of Autonomic Societies.

== Abstracting and indexing ==
The journal is abstracted and indexed in:

- Current Contents/Clinical Medicine
- EBSCO databases
- Elsevier Biobase
- Embase
- Index Medicus/MEDLINE/PubMed
- ProQuest databases
- Science Citation Index
- Scopus

According to the Journal Citation Reports, the journal has a 2021 impact factor of 4.435.
