= Jean Calder =

Australian aid worker (1932/1933–2022)

Jean Elizabeth Calder AC (1932 or 1933 – 28 November 2022) was an Australian rehabilitation specialist and humanitarian worker who spent more than 25 years working with the Palestinian Red Crescent Society (PRCS) in refugee camps and with disabled people in Lebanon, Gaza and Egypt.

Following her appointment as a Companion of the Order of Australia (Australia's highest honour) in 2005, SBS broadcast a half-hour documentary, Doctor of Hope, on Calder's humanitarian work with the disabled and disadvantaged in the Middle East. It was presented by George Negus and reported by Elizabeth Tadic.

Calder's autobiography, Where the Road Leads: An Australian Woman’s Journey of Love and Determination, was published by Hachette Australia in 2007. Reviewer Heather Pavitt admired her "absolute dedication" to her work with "underprivileged, disabled Palestinians".

Calder died in Khan Yunis on 28 November 2022, at the age of 89.

== Awards and recognition ==
- Calder was made a Companion of the Order of Australia (AC) in the 2005 Australia Day Honours for "humanitarian service in the Middle East, particularly to people with disabilities living in refugee camps in Lebanon and Gaza and disadvantaged areas in Cairo, to international relations, and to academic and professional training in the fields of education and rehabilitation."
- Awarded Doctor of Science honoris causa, University of Queensland, 2012
- University of Queensland Alumnus of the Year, 2012

== Works ==
- Calder, Jean E; University of Queensland. Dept. of Human Movement Studies (1976), Motor Activity Ideas Manual for Teachers, University of Queensland, Dept. of Human Movement Studies
- Calder, Jean E (1977), Participant Observation Study of a Group of Mentally Retarded Adults — March 19 to May 18, 1977, Pennsylvania State University
- Calder, Jean E; University of Queensland. Department of Human Movement Studies (1979), The Queensland Motor Performance Screening Test for Young Children, University of Queensland, Dept. of Human Movement Studies, ISBN 978-0-86776-027-9
- Calder, Jean E (2007), Where the Road Leads: An Australian woman's journey of love and determination, Hachette Australia, ISBN 978-0-7336-2037-9
