= Gary Sturgess =

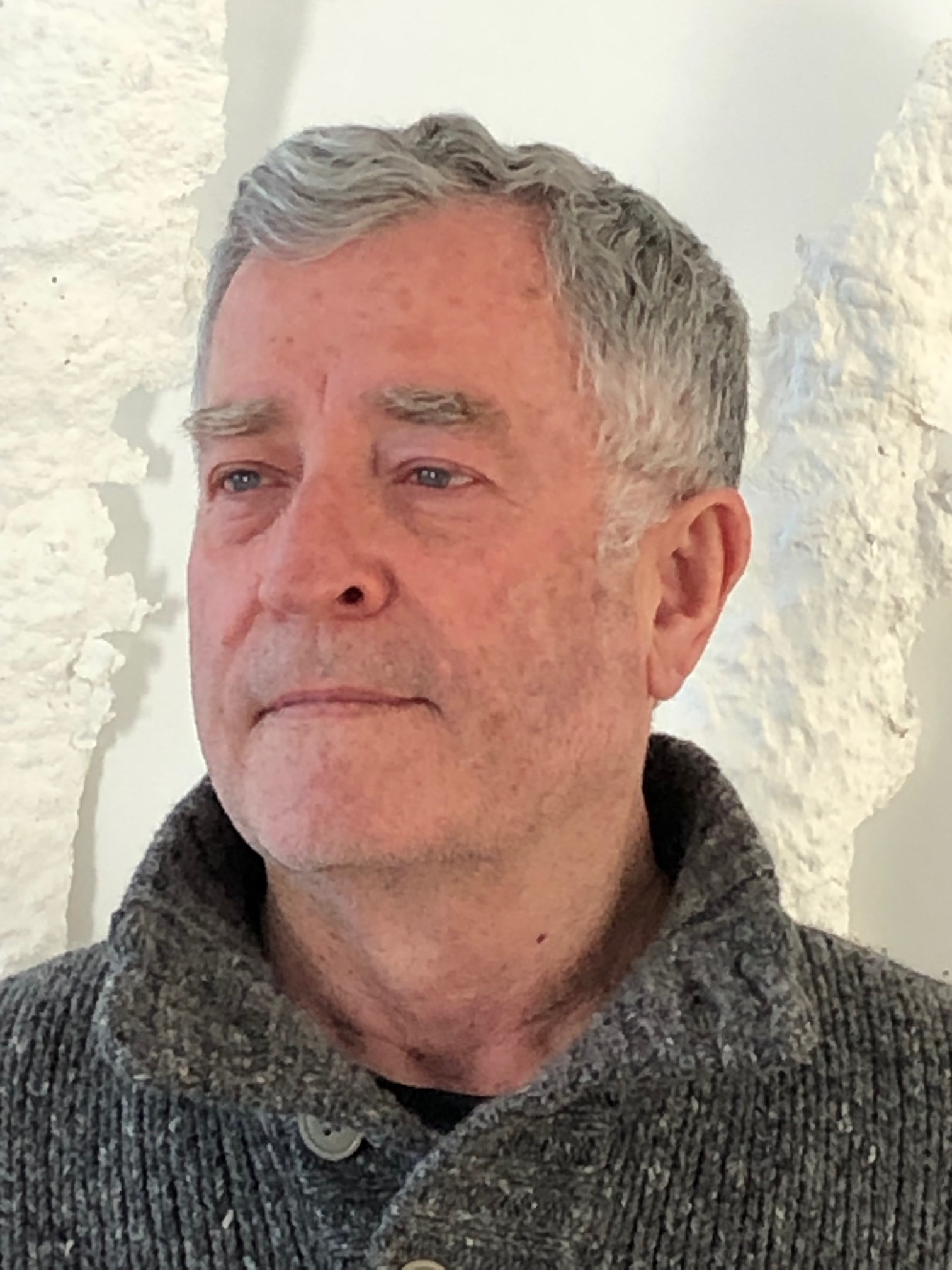
Gary L. Sturgess in 2022

Gary L. Sturgess AM is an academic and former public servant from Sydney, Australia, whose research is focused on the management of front line public services. He currently an adjunct professor of Public Service Innovation with the School of Government and International Relations at Griffith University, in Brisbane, Australia.

Since 2020, he has undertaken detailed interviews on the transformation of two public services - the John Morony Correctional Centre in north-west Sydney, and New South Wales Public Health Pathology, exploring the work of high-performing operational managers and identifying the conditions necessary for sustainable productivity reform in public services.

From 2011 to 2022, he held the New South Wales Premier’s Chair in Public Service Delivery with the Australia and New Zealand School of Government (ANZSOG), in Sydney, Australia., specialising in the commissioning of public services from public and private sector managers.

From 2003 to 2011, he was Executive Director of the Serco Institute, a London-based think tank specialising in the design and management of public service contracting. He was previously Cabinet Secretary in New South Wales, Australia, under Premier Nick Greiner, during which time he designed a number of major policy initiatives including Australia's first anti-corruption agency the NSW Independent Commission Against Corruption (ICAC) and the corporatisation and commercialisation of government business enterprises.

== Early years ==
Sturgess is descended on both sides from convicts, who moved north through New South Wales to south-east Queensland in the late 19th century with the break-up of the great squatting runs. His great-grandfathers on both sides, and his paternal grandfather, were farmers. In the 1950s, his father established an engine reconditioning business in Dalby, Queensland, a small town approximately 200 kilometres (120 miles) inland from Brisbane, serving the farming community.

He grew up in Dalby, the second of four sons of Lindsay and Joy Sturgess. He was educated at local state schools, left home at 17 years of age, and graduated in law from the University of Queensland. He and his wife Helen managed a jewellery store in Fortitude Valley, Queensland while he finished his law degree.

== Career ==
Sturgess commenced his professional career in Brisbane as an investment analyst for what was then one of Australia's largest mining companies, MIM Holdings Ltd. In 1980, he moved to Sydney to become the legal correspondent for the Australian news magazine The Bulletin, where he had a law and civil liberties round.

In 1982, he was recruited by Jim Carlton, recently appointed as Federal Minister for Health, to serve as his private secretary. Following the fall of the Fraser government in March 1983, he joined the staff of the newly elected Leader of the New South Wales Opposition, Nick Greiner, as the Director of Research and Policy Development. In addition to policy work, he undertook extensive research into corruption in the then NSW Government, contributing to a number of public inquiries and criminal prosecutions. His extensive database resulted in the then Leader of the Opposition and later Premier Bob Carr to refer to him as "Lord of the Files".

Upon the change of government in March 1988, Sturgess was appointed as Director-General of the NSW Cabinet Office in the Liberal-National Coalition government led by Premier Nick Greiner, to oversee the implementation of the reform agenda they had developed. In the five years he served as Cabinet Secretary, Sturgess personally drove a number of key policy initiatives, including the establishment of Australia's first anti-corruption body, the NSW Independent Commission Against Corruption, the corporatisation of government business enterprises, the so-called "new environmentalism" (including tradeable air, water and fishing permits), and some of the earliest work in Australia on the use of markets in the electricity sector.

From 1990, he was actively involved in the "new federalism" agenda, initiated by Prime Minister Bob Hawke and Premier Greiner. He led a team of NSW officials at a series of Special Premiers Conferences that produced new policies such as the National Competition Policy, the National Electricity Market, mutual recognition of state regulations, and, ultimately, the formation of the Council of Australian Governments.

He retired from public administration in late 1992, six months after the resignation of Greiner as Premier. From 1993 to 2000, Sturgess chaired a series of government inquiries - into business regulation, the governance of the Great Barrier Reef Marine Park Authority, the financial management of the Australian Federal Police and the rationalisation of Australia's border controls, among other issues.

He also served on a number of public, private and not-for-profit boards, including the Australian Constitutional Centenary Foundation, the NSW Police Board and spent seven years as a non-executive director of the Serco Group PLC, a FTSE-100 public service company operating in Europe, North America and Asia-Pacific.

In 2000, Sturgess relocated to London, where he joined Serco as Adviser to the Board and then from January 2003, as Executive Director of the Serco Institute, an externally-facing thinktank whose purpose was "to foster the development of sustainable public service markets through an outward-facing programme of research and communication". In that capacity, he played a leading role in the establishment of the Public Services Strategy Board, the UK's first industry association representing the public service industry, underneath the umbrella of the Confederation of British Industry. He continued to serve as adviser to the Public Services Strategy Board until he left the UK in 2011.

During the Blair years, Sturgess was a member of a number of advisory boards and government taskforces on the UK public services sector.

He resigned from the Serco Institute in April 2011 and returned to Australia to take up the New South Wales Premier's ANZSOG Chair in Public Service Delivery at the University of New South Wales, a research position based in the government precinct in Sydney studying the challenges involved in front-line service delivery. In 2014, he was also appointed as Professor of Public Service Innovation at Griffith University in Brisbane, Australia, formalising a long-standing relationship with the university.

Sturgess was appointed by the NSW government in 2015 to chair an inquiry into 'point-to-point transportation', which resulted in the legalisation of ride-sharing and a substantial reconstruction of the regulations governing the taxi industry to enable them to compete.

He remains a staunch defender of the NSW Independent Commission Against Corruption, while occasionally being critical of its excesses.

== Research in Public Management ==
On taking up the chair with ANZSOG in 2011, Sturgess specialised in studying the relationship between policy/funding and delivery, with a particular focus on the discipline of commissioning. As part of that research agenda, he developed a contestability framework for public services—"benchmarking with consequences"—building on the work of the British health economist Chris Ham. He has been actively involved in the application of these principles in the real world, and in 2015, he was appointed by New South Wales Cabinet to chair a Commissioning and Contestability Advisory Board, advising the NSW Minister for Corrections. In 2016, the NSW government established a Commissioning and Contestability Unit in Treasury, based on his work.

Sturgess has advised a number of government inquiries on commissioning - the Victorian and Queensland Commissions of Audit (2012 and 2013), the National Commission of Audit (2014), the Harper Review of Competition Policy, the New Zealand Productivity Commission's review of social services (2015) and the Australian Productivity Commission's review of human services (2016). He has also advised numerous central and line departments and agencies in Australia, New Zealand, the UK and Canada. He lectured at the UK government's Commissioning Academy from 2013 to 2016, and continues to deliver lectures on commissioning as part of the Public Sector Transformation Academy. He also taught a three-day Commissioning Academy in Ontario, Canada from 2015 to 2018, and in Ottawa.

In March 2017, Sturgess published a study of public service contracting in the UK, for the Business Services Association, entitled Just Another Paperclip?, based on interviews with 78 individuals from 24 large and medium-sized public service providers, current and former chief executives, politicians, former ministerial advisers and union officials. He was highly critical of the way in which public service contracting has developed in recent years, and laid the primary responsibility on government, arguing that public service markets are not like commodity markets, but rather are government's supply chain.

He was co-author of a research report, Getting the Work of Government Done, commissioned by the Australian Public Service Review, and published in March 2019, focused on commissioning and contracting.

== Convict Research ==
Since 2000, Sturgess has also undertaken a great deal of original research into the contractual arrangements used for transporting convicts to Australia in the early years of European settlement, and the legal, financial and commercial system underpinning it. He has delivered a number of academic papers, published articles in peer-reviewed journals, such as The Mariner's Mirror, the Great Circle and the Australian Economic History Review, and a series of essays on the operation of this system. In tracking down the descendants of those involved in the early years of the Botany Bay system, he has located a number of important artefacts from the period, including a miniature of a NSW Corps captain who arrived on Australia's Second Fleet, and a silver cup presented by Governor Arthur Phillip to the captain of the first ship to catch a whale off the NSW coast. In 2024, he has a series of 'research notes' being published in The Great Circle.

In 2012, prompted by a conversation with the archaeologist at The Rocks, Sturgess started detailed research to identify the site where the founding Governor of Australia, Arthur Phillip, came ashore in Sydney Cove on 26 January 1788: the site where European invasion began. His research is based on documents, maps and drawings that have come to light in the more than 50 years since the question had last been considered.

He also led a media campaign, which resulted in the port-a-loo that had been erected on the landing site being removed.

In 2024, Sturgess launched a website which publishes his convict research.

== Honours ==
Sturgess was awarded membership of the Order of Australia in January 2005, for services to government, in a ceremony at Buckingham Palace.

In 2022, he was appointed as a Distinguished Fellow with the Australia and New Zealand School of Government.

== Personal ==
He married his wife Helen, an artist, in Brisbane in 1976, and they are the parents of four children and four grandsons.

Since his father's death in 1987, Sturgess has been a director of the family business, Engine Australia, an after-market diesel engine parts supplier.

From 2016 to 2019, he served on the Heritage Council of New South Wales. He currently serves on the executive committee of the Blue Mountains branch of the National Trust of Australia (NSW). He is also the co-founder and deputy chair of a community alliance in the Blue Mountains village where he lives.
