= American Autonomic Society =

US research organization

- Type: Learned society
- Region served: United States of America
- Website: americanautonomicsociety.org

The American Autonomic Society is a scientific society with a particular focus on clinical aspects of the autonomic nervous system. Its official journal, Clinical Autonomic Research, is published by Springer Science+Business Media.

== See also ==
- International Society for Autonomic Neuroscience
