= Japan Society of Neurovegetative Research =

- Type: Learned society
- Region served: Japan

This is main scientific society in Japan interested in the study of the Autonomic Nervous System. It is affiliated with the Japanese Association of Medical Sciences. Its official journal is The Autonomic Nervous System (Jiritsu shinkei; ISSN 0288-9250) founded in 1964.
