= Brain and Mind Centre =

Research institute at University of Sydney

- Founders: Ian Hickie; Max Bennett
- Established: 2015; 11 years ago
- Director: Ian Hickie AM
- Faculty: University of Sydney
- Adjunct faculty: Sydney Medical School; Faculty of Science; Royal Prince Alfred Hospital
- Formerly called: Brain and Mind Research Institute
- Location: 94 Mallet Street, Camperdown, Sydney, New South Wales, Australia
- Coordinates: 33°53′21″S 151°10′40″E
- Interactive map of Brain and Mind Centre
- Website: sydney.edu.au/brain-mind/

The Brain and Mind Centre (BMC) at the University of Sydney was established for the research and treatment of disorders of the brain and mind.

== History ==
The research facility known as the Brain and Mind Research Institute was founded in 2003 by Professor Ian Hickie AO and Professor Max Bennett AO. The Brain and Mind Centre launched in 2015. The Centre was renamed in 2015 and is located adjacent to the University of Sydney in Camperdown, Sydney, New South Wales. It was recognised as a multidisciplinary strategic priority for the University.

The research centre is affiliated with the University of Sydney, the Sydney Area Health Service and Royal Prince Alfred Hospital.

== See also ==
- Health in Australia
