= Peter Hacker =

British philosopher (born 1939)

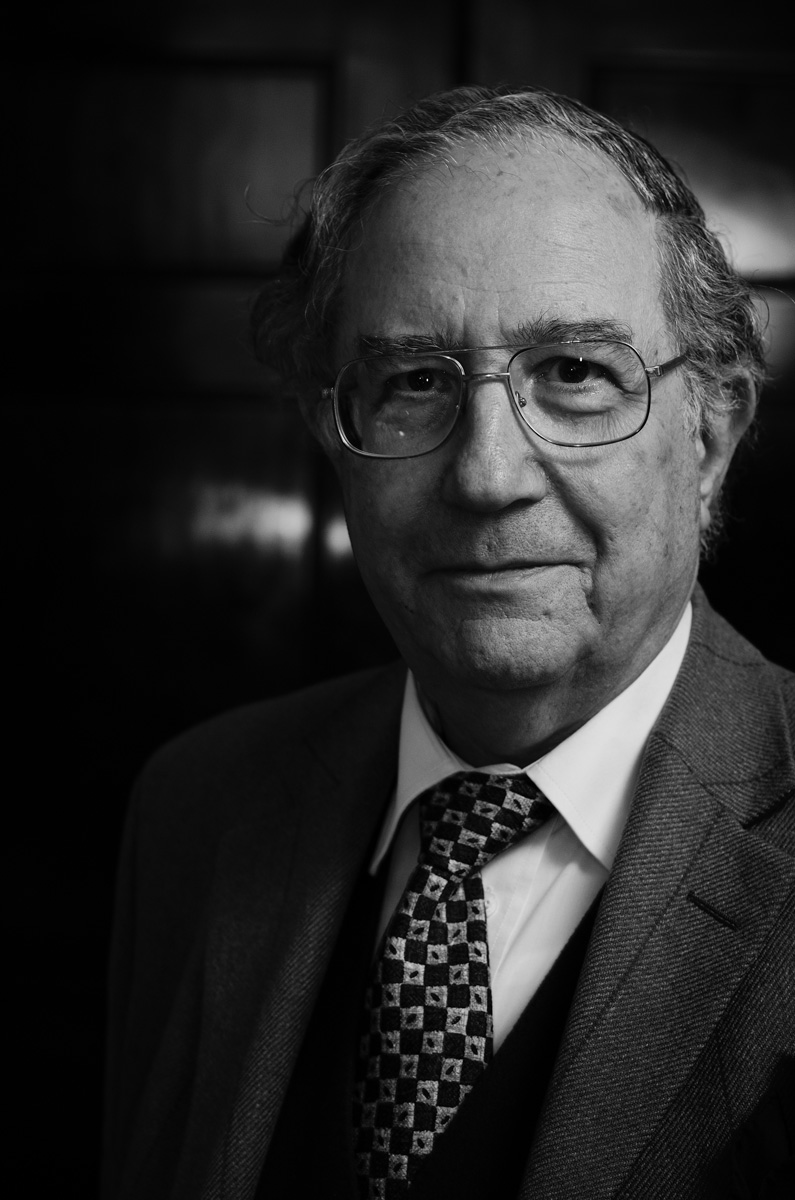
- Hacker in 2013
- Born: Peter Michael Stephan Hacker; 15 July 1939 (age 87); London, England

Education
- Education: The Queen's College, Oxford; St Antony's College, Oxford
- Doctoral advisor: H. L. A. Hart

Philosophical work
- Era: Contemporary philosophy
- Region: Western philosophy
- School: Analytic philosophy
- Institutions: St John's College, Oxford
- Main interests: Philosophy of language, philosophy of mind, neurophilosophy, Ludwig Wittgenstein, philosophical anthropology
- Notable ideas: Application of the mereological fallacy to neuroscience

Peter Michael Stephan Hacker (born 15 July 1939) is a British philosopher whose work concerns the philosophy of mind, philosophy of language and philosophical anthropology. He has written on the philosophy of Ludwig Wittgenstein, including a four-volume commentary on the Philosophical Investigations, the first two volumes of which were co-authored with G. P. Baker. His other work includes a critique of the conceptual foundations of cognitive neuroscience, developed with the neuroscientist Max Bennett, and a four-volume study of human nature. He was a tutorial fellow of St John's College, Oxford, from 1966 to 2006 and subsequently became an emeritus fellow.

== Education and career ==
Hacker studied philosophy, politics and economics at The Queen's College, Oxford, from 1960 to 1963. He undertook graduate work at St Antony's College, Oxford, from 1963 to 1965 under the supervision of H. L. A. Hart. In 1965, he became a junior research fellow at Balliol College, Oxford, where he completed his DPhil thesis, "Rules and Duties", in 1966.

He held a tutorial fellowship at St John's College from 1966 until his retirement in 2006. He was an emeritus research fellow from 2006 to 2015 and subsequently an emeritus fellow. In 2010, he was elected an honorary fellow of The Queen's College.

Hacker was a British Academy research reader in the humanities from 1985 to 1987 and a Leverhulme senior research fellow from 1991 to 1994. He held a part-time professorship at the University of Kent from 2013 to 2016 and an honorary professorship at University College London's Institute of Neurology from 2019 to 2024.

His visiting appointments included positions at Makerere College in 1968, Swarthmore College in 1973 and 1986, the University of Michigan in 1974, Queen's University in 1984 and the University of Bologna in 2009.

== Philosophical work ==
=== Wittgenstein and philosophical method ===
Hacker's approach to philosophy is influenced by the later work of Wittgenstein. He regards conceptual clarification as a central task of philosophy and distinguishes it from empirical scientific investigation. His method examines the uses of words and the relationships between concepts to identify and resolve philosophical confusion.

Hacker's Analytical Commentary on the Philosophical Investigations was published in four volumes between 1980 and 1996, with Baker co-authoring the first two. The Stanford Encyclopedia of Philosophy describes their interpretation as an approach centred on Wittgenstein's notion of philosophical grammar and a systematic examination of the uses of words.

In a review of Wittgenstein: Comparisons and Context, Diego Marconi praised Hacker's knowledge of Wittgenstein's writings but argued that his commitment to Wittgenstein's philosophical approach sometimes led him to give insufficient attention to objections.

=== Philosophy of mind and neuroscience ===
In Philosophical Foundations of Neuroscience (2003), Hacker and Bennett examine the conceptual assumptions of cognitive neuroscience. They criticise accounts of perception, memory, thought and consciousness advanced by neuroscientists and philosophers, including Francis Crick, Antonio Damasio, Daniel Dennett and John Searle.

Bennett and Hacker argue that psychological attributes, such as perceiving, remembering and deciding, belong to people and other animals as wholes. They describe the attribution of these capacities to the brain or its parts as a mereological fallacy. Their criticism concerns the interpretation of neuroscientific findings, they accept the investigation of the neural mechanisms that make these capacities possible. Hacker also rejects mind–brain identity theories, functionalism and eliminative materialism, and criticises philosophical accounts of qualia.

Dennett and Searle challenged Bennett and Hacker's position in Neuroscience and Philosophy: Brain, Mind, and Language (2007), which includes their criticisms and Bennett and Hacker's replies.

=== Philosophical anthropology ===
Between 2007 and 2021, Hacker published a tetralogy on human nature as a contribution to philosophical anthropology. The first volume, Human Nature: The Categorial Framework (2007), examines concepts including substance, causation, powers, agency, rationality, mind, body and personhood. The second, The Intellectual Powers: A Study of Human Nature (2013), examines consciousness, intentionality, language, knowledge, belief, perception, memory, thought and imagination.

The third volume, The Passions: A Study of Human Nature (2017), examines emotions including pride, shame, envy, jealousy, anger, love and sympathy, drawing on examples from literature. The final volume, The Moral Powers: A Study of Human Nature (2021), addresses morality, evil, freedom, determinism, responsibility, happiness and the meaning of life.

Reviewing the first volume, Michael Quante praised Hacker's conceptual distinctions but questioned whether his method could adequately account for conceptual changes associated with scientific and technological developments. Kevin Lynch's review of the second volume praised the detail of its analyses while criticising some of its interpretations of competing philosophical theories.

== Selected publications ==
- Insight and Illusion: Wittgenstein on Philosophy and the Metaphysics of Experience. Clarendon Press, 1972. ISBN 0-19-824369-3. Revised edition: Insight and Illusion: Themes in the Philosophy of Wittgenstein, 1986. ISBN 0-19-824783-4.
- An Analytical Commentary on the Philosophical Investigations. Four volumes. Blackwell, 1980–1996; the first two volumes with G. P. Baker.
- Wittgenstein's Place in Twentieth-Century Analytic Philosophy. Blackwell, 1996. ISBN 0-631-20098-3.
- With Max Bennett: Philosophical Foundations of Neuroscience. Blackwell, 2003. ISBN 1-4051-0855-X.
- With Max Bennett, Daniel Dennett and John Searle: Neuroscience and Philosophy: Brain, Mind, and Language. Columbia University Press, 2007. ISBN 978-0-231-14044-7.
- Human nature tetralogy. Four volumes. Blackwell and Wiley-Blackwell, 2007–2021.
