= Geoffrey Burnstock =

British-Australian neuroscientist

Geoffrey Burnstock AC FAA FRS
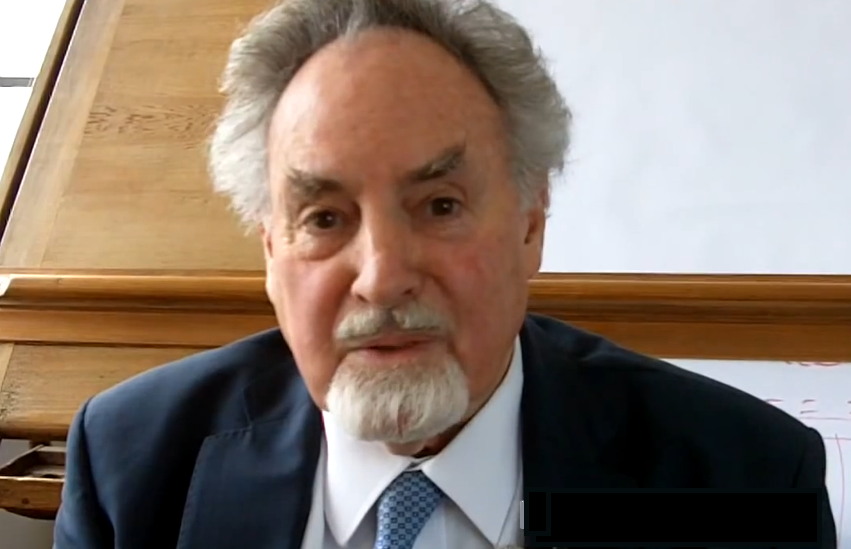
- Born: 10 May 1929; London, England
- Died: 2 June 2020 (aged 91); Melbourne, Victoria, Australia
- Education: King's College London; University College London
- Children: Aviva Burnstock
- Awards: Royal Medal (2000); FRS (1986)
- Scientific career
- Fields: Purinergic signalling
- Workplaces: UCL Medical School

Geoffrey Burnstock (10 May 1929 – 2 June 2020) was a British-Australian neurobiologist who was President of the Autonomic Neuroscience Centre of the UCL Medical School. He is best known for coining the term purinergic signalling, which he discovered in the 1970s. He retired in October 2017 at the age of 88.

== Life and career ==
Burnstock was educated at Greenford County School, King's College London (BSc, 1953) and at University College London (PhD, 1957). He played a key role in the discovery of ATP as neurotransmitter. He was appointed to a Senior Lectureship in Melbourne University in 1959 and became Professor and Chairman of Zoology in 1964.

In 1975, he became Head of Department of Anatomy and Developmental Biology at UCL and Convenor of the Center of Neuroscience. He has been Director of the Autonomic Neuroscience Institute at the Royal Free Hospital School of Medicine since 1997. He was elected to the Australian Academy of Science in 1971, the Royal Society in 1986, the International Academy of Science, Munich, the Academy of Medical Sciences in 1998 and an Honorary Fellow of the Royal College of Surgeons and the Royal College of Physicians in 1999 and 2000. He was awarded the Royal Society Gold Medal in 2000. Within his research field, he has been recognised through appointments as the first president of the International Society for Autonomic Neuroscience and his role as editor in chief of the scientific journal Autonomic Neuroscience: Basic and Clinical.

He supervised over 100 PhD and MD students and published over 1400 original papers, reviews and books. He was first in the Institute of Scientific Information list of most cited scientists in Pharmacology and Toxicology from 1994–2004.

Burnstock was editor-in-chief of the Purinergic Signalling journal. He was an atheist.

Burnstock was awarded the 2017 Australian Academy of Science's Macfarlane Burnet Medal in recognition of his outstanding scientific research in the biological science.

He died on 2 June 2020 at the age of 91.

== Legacy ==
His lasting work with ATP-related signalling was first published in the 1970s, which led to a rapid surge in interest in the field and subsequently made him the most cited scientist in pharmacology and toxicology for several years during the 2000s. Much of our understanding of purinergic signalling and the current classification of purinergic receptors is attributed to the work of Burnstock. He was the founding president of the International Society for Autonomic Neuroscience.

According to The New York Times, Burnstock is recognised as "the scientist who brought ATP into the realm of brain research."

== See also ==
- Gefapixant, a first-in-class P2RX3 receptor blocker named in honour of Burnstock.
