= John D. Pollard =

Australian university professor

John David Pollard (born 6 January 1941) is professor of neurology at the University of Sydney, Australia. He attended Sydney Boys High School from 1953 to 1958. After graduating with honours in a Bachelor of Science (medical) from the University of Sydney in 1964, he went on to study medicine at the same institution, graduating with honours in 1966 and completing a PhD studying nerve transplantation in 1973. He trained in neurology at Royal Prince Alfred Hospital, Sydney, and subsequently as research fellow and registrar at the Royal Free Hospital and the National Hospital for Neurology and Neurosurgery, Queen Square, London.

Pollard has been the chair of executive and head, Department of Medicine, University of Sydney; the professor of clinical neurosciences, University of Sydney; and, from 1997, the Bushell Professor of Neurology at University of Sydney], a role from which he retired in 2008. He has been a director of the Brain and Mind Research Institute, the University of Sydney, since 2004.

Pollard's research has focussed on, but not confined to, the pathogenesis of acute and chronic inflammatory neuropathies. He described the immunopathology of idiopathic demyelinating neuropathy showing T cell subsets, mononuclear cells and Human Leukocyte Antigen class I and II expression within nerve, demonstrating the possibility of an immunological role for Schwann cells, and challenging the dogma that nerve was an immunologically privileged site. His group subsequently described antimyelin antibodies in animal models of the disease, and demonstrated the efficacy of plasma exchange, a therapy that he subsequently pioneered in Australia for the human conditions Guillain–Barré syndrome and chronic inflammatory demyelinating polyneuropathy (CIDP). He has authored over 150 articles in peer-reviewed journals and 25 book chapters.

Pollard received the award of Officer of the Order of Australia, General Division (AO) for service to medicine in 2005 .
